Here is a list of the records in the National Football League (NFL) set by individual players.

Service 
 Most seasons: 26, George Blanda, 1949–1958, 1960–1975
 Most seasons, one team: 21, Jason Hanson (Detroit Lions), 1992–2012
Most games played, career: 382, Morten Andersen, 1982–2007 
 Most games played, one team: 327, Jason Hanson (Detroit Lions), 1992–2012
Most consecutive games played, career: 352, Jeff Feagles, 1988–2009
Most consecutive games played, one team: 270, Jim Marshall (Minnesota Vikings), 1961–1979
Most consecutive snaps: 10,363, Joe Thomas (Cleveland Browns), 2007–2017

Starts 
Note: These records are not listed in the NFL Record and Fact Book.

 Most starts, career: 
 Regular season: 335, Tom Brady, 2001–2022.
 Playoffs: 48, Tom Brady, 2002–2022.
 Most starts, career, one team: 293, Bruce Matthews (Houston / Tennessee Oilers / Titans), 1983–2001
 Most consecutive starts: 297 (321 including playoffs), Brett Favre, 1992–2010
 Most consecutive starts to begin a career: 208 (227 including playoffs) Peyton Manning, 1998–2011
 Most consecutive starts to begin a career, including playoffs: 231 (207 regular season; 24 playoffs) Gene Upshaw, 1967–1981
Most consecutive starts by a quarterback: 297 (321 including playoffs), Brett Favre, 1992–2010
 Most consecutive starts by a receiver: 176 (185 including playoffs), Tim Brown, 1992–2003
 Most consecutive starts by a running back: 170 (178 including playoffs), Walter Payton, 1975–1987
 Most consecutive starts by an offensive lineman: 240 (259 including playoffs), Mick Tingelhoff, 1962–1979
 Most consecutive starts by a defensive lineman: 270 (289 including playoffs), Jim Marshall, 1961–1978
 Most consecutive starts by a linebacker: 215 (221 including playoffs), London Fletcher, 2000–2013
 Most consecutive starts by a defensive back: 215 (224 including playoffs), Ronde Barber, 1999–2012

Scoring 
Most points scored, career: 2,673, Adam Vinatieri, 1996–2020
 Most points scored, season: 186, LaDainian Tomlinson, 2006
 Most points scored, season, no touchdowns: 166, David Akers, 2011
 Most points scored, season, rookie: 150, Cody Parkey, 2014
 Most seasons leading league: 5, Don Hutson, 1940–1944; Gino Cappelletti, 1961, 1963–1966; Stephen Gostkowski, 2008, 2012–2015
 Most consecutive seasons leading league: 5, Don Hutson, 1940–1944
 Most seasons, 100+ points: 21, Adam Vinatieri, 1996–2008, 2010, 2012–2018
 Most points scored, game: 40, Ernie Nevers, Nov 28, 1929
 Most points scored, game, no touchdowns: 26, Rob Bironas, Oct 21, 2007
 Most consecutive games scoring: 360, Morten Andersen, 1983–2004, 2006–2007

Touchdowns 
Note: this section applies to touchdowns scored by running, receiving, or returning. Passing touchdowns are listed separately.
 Most touchdowns, career: 208, Jerry Rice, 1985–2004
 Most touchdowns, season: 31, LaDainian Tomlinson, 2006
 Most touchdowns, rookie season: 22, Gale Sayers, 1965
 Most seasons leading league touchdowns: 8, Don Hutson, 1935–1938, 1941–1944
 Most consecutive seasons leading league touchdowns: 4, Don Hutson, 1935–1938, 1941–1944
 Most touchdowns, game:  6, Ernie Nevers, Nov 28, 1929; Dub Jones, Nov 25, 1951; Gale Sayers, Dec 12, 1965; Alvin Kamara, Dec 25, 2020
 Most consecutive games touchdown: 18, LaDainian Tomlinson, 2004–05; Lenny Moore, 1963–65

Points after touchdown 
 Most seasons leading league: 8, George Blanda, 1956, 1961–62, 1967–1969, 1972, 1974
 Most kicking attempts, career: 959, George Blanda, 1949–1976
 Most kicks made, career: 943, George Blanda, 1949–1976
 Most kicking attempts, season: 75, Matt Prater, 2013
 Most kicks made, season: 75, Matt Prater, 2013
 Most kicks made, rookie season: 60, Doug Brien, 1994
 Most kicks attempted, game: 10, Charlie Gogolak, Nov 27, 1966
 Most kicks made, game: 9, Pat Harder, Oct 17, 1948, Bob Waterfield, Oct 22, 1950 and Charlie Gogolak, Nov 27, 1966
 Most kicks made no misses, season: 75, Matt Prater, 2013
 Most kicks made no misses, rookie season: 54, Cody Parkey, 2014
 Most kicks made no misses, game: 9, Pat Harder, Oct 17, 1948 and Bob Waterfield, Oct 22, 1950
 Most consecutive kicks made: 478, Stephen Gostkowski, 2006–2016
 Most consecutive kicks made (including playoffs): 523, Stephen Gostkowski, Dec 31, 2006 – Jan 16, 2016
 Highest percentage kicks made career (minimum 200 attempts): 99.8%, Rian Lindell, (432/433) 2000–2013
 Most two point conversions, career: 7, Marshall Faulk, 1994–2005
 Most two point conversions, season: 4, Todd Heap, 2003
 Most two point conversions, game: 2, by 13 players, most recently Duke Johnson, Sep 30, 2018

Field goals 
 Most leading league: 5, Lou Groza, 1950, 1952–1954, 1957
 Most consecutive seasons leading league: 3, Lou Groza, 1952–1954
 Most field goals attempted, career: 709, Morten Andersen, 1982–2004, 2006–2007
 Most field goals made, career: 599, Adam Vinatieri, 1996–2019
 Most overtime field goals made, career: 11, Adam Vinatieri, 1996–2019
 Most field goals attempted, season: 52, David Akers, 2011
 Most field goals made, season: 44, David Akers, 2011
 Most field goals attempted, game: 9, Jim Bakken, Sep 24, 1967
 Most field goals made, game: 8, Rob Bironas, Oct 21, 2007
 Most field goals made, game, no misses: 8, Rob Bironas, Oct 21, 2007
 Most field goals made, one half: 5; Chris Boniol, Nov 18, 1996, Morten Andersen, Sep 3, 2000, Rob Bironas, Oct 21, 2007, and Mike Nugent, Sep 7, 2014
 Most field goals made, one quarter: 4, by 9 players, most recently Wil Lutz, Sep 30, 2018
 Most games, 1+ field goals made, career: 300, Adam Vinatieri, 1996–2019
 Most consecutive games with field goal made: 38, Matt Stover, 1999–2001
 Most consecutive field goals made: 44, Adam Vinatieri, Oct 4, 2015 – Oct 20, 2016
 Most consecutive field goals made (postseason): 23, Mason Crosby, Jan 15, 2011 – Jan 22, 2017
 Most consecutive field goals made (regular season and postseason combined): 46, Gary Anderson, Dec 15, 1997 – Jan 17, 1999
Longest field goal: 66 yards, Justin Tucker (vs. Lions), Sept 26, 2021
 Highest field goal percentage, career (minimum 100 FG made): 90.1% (237/263), Justin Tucker, 2012–2018
 Highest field goal percentage, season (minimum 20 attempts): 100.0%, Gary Anderson, 1998 (35/35); Mike Vanderjagt, 2003 (37/37); Jason Myers, 2020 (24/24) 
 Lowest field goal percentage, season (most attempts, none made): 0.0, Boris Shlapak (0/8), 1972
 Lowest field goal percentage, season (minimum 10 attempts): 6.67, Bob Timberlake (1/15), 1965
 Most field goals made, 50+ yards, career: 58, Sebastian Janikowski, 2000–2016
 Most field goals made, 60+ yards, career: 3, Brett Maher, 2018–2019
 Most field goals made, 50+ yards, season: 10, Blair Walsh, 2012; Justin Tucker, 2016
 Most field goals made, 50+ yards, game: 3, by 9 players, most recently Justin Tucker, Nov 27, 2016
 Most field goals made, 50+ yards, half: 3, Phil Dawson Sep 27, 2012, Justin Tucker, Nov 27, 2016

Safeties 
 Most safeties, career: 4, Ted Hendricks, 1969–1983; Doug English, 1975–1985; Jared Allen, 2004–2015; Justin Houston, 2011–present
 Most safeties, season: 2, by 19 players, most recently Justin Houston, 2020
 Most safeties, rookie season: 2, Jameel McClain, 2008; Jim Young, 1977
 Most safeties, game: 2, Fred Dryer, Oct 21, 1973
 Most safeties, one quarter: 2, Fred Dryer, Oct 21, 1973
 Most consecutive games, safety: 2, Doug English, Sep 4, 1983 – Sep 11, 1983
 Most consecutive seasons, safety: 3, Charlie Krueger, 1959–1961; Ted Hendricks, 1974–1976; Eric Swann, 1992–1994

Rushing

Rushing attempts 
 Most seasons leading league, rushing attempts: 6, Jim Brown; 1958–1959, 1961, 1963–1965
 Most consecutive seasons leading league, rushing attempts: 4; Steve Van Buren, 1947–1950 and Walter Payton, 1976–1979
 Most rushing attempts per game average, career: 21.2, Terrell Davis, 1995–2001
 Most rushing attempts, career: 4,409, Emmitt Smith, 1990–2004
 Most rushing attempts, season: 416, Larry Johnson, 2006
 Most rushing attempts, rookie, season: 390, Eric Dickerson, 1983
 Most rushing attempts, game: 45, Jamie Morris, Dec 17, 1988 (OT)
 Most rushing attempts, game, rookie: 45, Jamie Morris, Dec 17, 1988 (OT)
 Most rushing attempts, first game: 36, LaDainian Tomlinson, Sep 9, 2001
 Most rushing attempts, no fumbles, season: 397, Gerald Riggs, 1985
 Most consecutive rushing attempts, no fumbles, to start a career: 559, BenJarvus Green-Ellis, 2008–2012
 Most consecutive rushing attempts, no fumbles: 1,001, LaDainian Tomlinson, Oct 22, 2006-Nov 29, 2009
 Most seasons, 200 rushing attempts: 14, Emmitt Smith, 1990–2004
 Most seasons, 250 rushing attempts: 13, Emmitt Smith, 1991–2004
 Most seasons, 300 rushing attempts: 10, Walter Payton, 1976–1986
 Most consecutive seasons, 200 rushing attempts: 13, Emmitt Smith, 1990–2002
 Most consecutive seasons, 250 rushing attempts: 12, Emmitt Smith, 1991–2002
 Most consecutive seasons, 300 rushing attempts: 8, Eddie George, 1996–2003
 Most games, 20 rushing attempts, career: 121, Emmitt Smith, 1990–2004
 Most games, 25 rushing attempts, career: 56, Emmitt Smith, 1991–2004
 Most games, 30 rushing attempts, career: 21, Eric Dickerson, 1983–1991
 Most games, 35 rushing attempts, career: 7, Walter Payton, 1976–1984
 Most games, 40 rushing attempts, career: 2; James Wilder Sr., 1983–1984; Ricky Williams, 1999–2003
 Most games, 20 rushing attempts, season: 14, by 8 players, most recently Shaun Alexander, 2005
 Most games, 25 rushing attempts, season: 10; Larry Johnson, 2006; Jamal Anderson, 1998; Emmitt Smith, 1994
 Most games, 30 rushing attempts, season: 7, Earl Campbell, 1979
 Most games, 35 rushing attempts, season: 3; Earl Campbell, 1980; Eddie George, 2000

Rushing yards 
 Most seasons leading league: 8, Jim Brown; 1957–1961, 1963–1965
 Most consecutive seasons leading league: 5, Jim Brown, 1957–1961
 Most rushing yards per game average, career: 104.3, Jim Brown, 1957–1965
 Most rushing yards per game average, season: 143.1, O. J. Simpson, 1973
 Most yards gained, career: 18,355, Emmitt Smith, 1990–2004
 Most seasons, 500+ yards rushing: 16, Frank Gore, 2005–2020.
 Most seasons, 1,000+ yards rushing: 11, Emmitt Smith, 1991–2001
 Most seasons, 1,500+ yards rushing: 5, Barry Sanders, 1991–1997
 Most consecutive seasons, 500+ yards rushing: 16, Frank Gore, 2005–2020.
 Most consecutive seasons, 1,000+ yards rushing: 11, Emmitt Smith, 1991–2001
 Most consecutive seasons, 1,500+ yards rushing: 4, Barry Sanders, 1994–1997
 Most yards gained, season: 2,105, Eric Dickerson, 1984
 Most yards gained, no fumbles, season: 1,883, Barry Sanders, 1994
 Most yards gained, rookie, season: 1,808 Eric Dickerson, 1983
 Most yards gained, no fumbles, rookie, season: 1,307 Saquon Barkley, 2018
 Most yards gained, season, at Home: 1,125, Walter Payton, 1977
 Most yards gained, season, Away: 1,087, Eric Dickerson, 1984
 Most yards gained, back-to-back games: 476, O. J. Simpson, Nov 25, 1976-Dec 5, 1976
 Most yards gained, game: 296, Adrian Peterson, Nov 4, 2007
 Most yards gained, one half: 253, Adrian Peterson, Nov 4, 2007
 Most yards gained, first game: 194, Alan Ameche, Sep 25, 1955
 Most yards gained, game, rookie: 296, Adrian Peterson, Nov 4, 2007
 Most yards gained, one quarter: 165, Jamaal Charles, Dec 23, 2012
 Most games, 50+ yards rushing, career: 173, Emmitt Smith, 1990–2004
 Most games, 100+ yards rushing, career: 78, Emmitt Smith, 1990–2004
 Most games, 150+ yards rushing, career: 25, Barry Sanders, 1989–1998
 Most games, 200+ yards rushing, career: 6, O. J. Simpson, 1969–1979; Adrian Peterson, 2007–2015
 Most games, 250+ yards rushing, career: 2, O. J. Simpson, 1973–1976
 Most games, 100+ yards rushing, season: 14, Barry Sanders, 1997
 Most games, 150+ yards rushing, season: 7, Earl Campbell, 1980; Adrian Peterson, 2012
 Most games, 200+ yards rushing, season: 4, Earl Campbell, 1980
 Most consecutive games, 50+ yards rushing: 38, Priest Holmes, 2001–2003
 Most consecutive games, 100+ yards rushing: 14, Barry Sanders, 1997
 Most consecutive games, 150+ yards rushing: 4, Earl Campbell, 1980
 Most consecutive games, 200+ yards rushing: 2, O. J. Simpson, 1973, 1976; Earl Campbell 1980; Ricky Williams 2002; Jay Ajayi, 2016
 Most consecutive games to start a season, 100+ yards rushing: 8, DeMarco Murray, 2014
 Most rushing yards by a quarterback, career: 6,109, Michael Vick, 2001–2015
 Most rushing yards by a quarterback, season: 1,206, Lamar Jackson, 2019
 Most rushing yards by a quarterback, game: 181, Colin Kaepernick, Jan 12, 2013 (playoffs); 178, Justin Fields, November 6, 2022 (regular season)
 Most rushing yards per attempt, career (minimum 750 attempts): 7.0 yards (6,109 yards/873 attempts), Michael Vick, 2001–2015
 Most rushing yards per attempt, career (minimum 1,000 attempts): 5.38 yards (7,260 yards/1,332 attempts), Jamaal Charles, 2008–2018
 Highest average gain per attempt, rookie season (qualifiers): 8.44 yards (1,004 yards/119 attempts), Beattie Feathers, 1934
 Highest average gain per attempt, game (minimum 10 attempts): 17.3 yards, Michael Vick Dec 1, 2002 vs. Minnesota Vikings
 Fewest games to reach 1,000 career rushing yards: 8, Adrian Peterson, 2007
 Fewest games to reach 2,000 career rushing yards: 18, Eric Dickerson, 1983–1984
 Fewest games to reach 3,000 career rushing yards: 27, Eric Dickerson, 1983–1984
 Fewest games to reach 4,000 career rushing yards: 33, Eric Dickerson, 1983–1985
 Fewest games to reach 5,000 career rushing yards: 45, Eric Dickerson, 1983–1985
 Fewest games to reach 6,000 career rushing yards: 53, Eric Dickerson, 1983–1986
 Fewest games to reach 7,000 career rushing yards: 63, Eric Dickerson, 1983–1986
 Fewest games to reach 8,000 career rushing yards: 73, Eric Dickerson, 1983–1987
 Fewest games to reach 9,000 career rushing yards: 82, Eric Dickerson, 1983–1988
 Fewest games to reach 10,000 career rushing yards: 91, Eric Dickerson, 1983–1989
 Fewest games to reach 11,000 career rushing yards: 103, Eric Dickerson, 1983–1989
 Fewest games to reach 12,000 career rushing yards: 115, Jim Brown, 1957-1965
 Fewest games to reach 13,000 career rushing yards: 133, Barry Sanders, 1989–1997

Rushing touchdowns 

 Most seasons leading league, touchdowns: 5, Jim Brown; 1957–1959, 1963, 1965
 Most consecutive seasons leading league, touchdowns: 3, Steve Van Buren, 1947–1949; Jim Brown, 1957–1959; Abner Haynes (American Football League), 1960–1962; Cookie Gilchrist (American Football League), 1962–1964; Jim Brown, 1966–1968
 Most touchdowns, career: 164, Emmitt Smith, 1990–2004
 Most rushing touchdowns, season: 28, LaDainian Tomlinson, 2006
 Most rushing touchdowns, rookie, season: 18, Eric Dickerson, 1983
 Most rushing touchdowns, season, at Home: 16, Terry Allen, 1996; Priest Holmes, 2003; Shaun Alexander, 2005
 Most rushing touchdowns, season, Away: 16, John Riggins, 1983
Most rushing touchdowns in a single postseason: 8, Terrell Davis, 1997
 Most rushing touchdowns, game: 6, Ernie Nevers, 11-28-1929; Alvin Kamara, 12-25-2020.
 Most rushing touchdowns, one half: 4, Jim Brown, Nov 18, 1962; Roland Hooks, Sep 9, 1979; Chuck Muncie, Nov 29, 1981; Eric Dickerson, Oct 31, 1988; Shaun Alexander, Sep 29, 2002; Priest Holmes, Oct 24, 2004; Doug Martin, Nov 4, 2012
 Most seasons, 1+ rushing touchdowns: 16, Marcus Allen, 1982–1997
 Most consecutive seasons, 1+ rushing touchdowns: 16, Marcus Allen, 1982–1997
 Most games, 1+ rushing touchdowns, career: 117, Emmitt Smith, 1990–2004
 Most games, 1+ rushing touchdowns, season: 15, Emmitt Smith, 1995
 Most consecutive games, 1+ rushing touchdown: 14, LaDainian Tomlinson, 2004–2005
 Most rushing touchdowns by a quarterback, career: 74, Cam Newton, 2011–2021.
 Most rushing touchdowns by a quarterback, season: 14, Cam Newton, 2011
 Most rushing touchdowns by a quarterback, game: 4, many players

Passing

Passer rating 
 Most seasons led league: 6, Sammy Baugh, 1937, 1940, 1943, 1945, 1948, 1949; Steve Young, 1991–1994, 1996–1997
 Most consecutive seasons led league: 4, Steve Young, 1991–1994
 Highest passer rating, career (minimum 1,500 attempts): 105.8, Patrick Mahomes, 2017–2021
 Highest passer rating, season (minimum 100 attempts): 122.5, Aaron Rodgers, 2011
 Highest passer rating, rookie, season: 104.9, Dak Prescott, 2016
 Youngest player, 158.3 perfect passer rating, game: Marcus Mariota (21 years, 318 days), Sep 13, 2015
 Oldest player, 158.3 perfect passer rating, game: Tom Brady (43 years, 145 days), Dec 26, 2020
 Most games, 100+ passer rating, career: 147, Tom Brady, 2001–2022
 Most games, 120+ passer rating, career: 64, Drew Brees, 2002–2020
 Most games, 130+ passer rating, career: 42, Drew Brees, 2002–2020
 Most games, 140+ passer rating, career: 22, Tom Brady, 2001–2022
 Most games, 150+ passer rating, career: 9, Ben Roethlisberger, 2004–2018
 Most games, 158.3 perfect passer rating, career (including playoffs): 4, Ben Roethlisberger, 2005–2018; Peyton Manning, 2000–2003
 Most games, 100+ passer rating, season: 14, Aaron Rodgers, 2020
 Most games, 120+ passer rating, season: 10, Aaron Rodgers, 2020
 Most games, 130+ passer rating, season: 6, Aaron Rodgers, 2011 and 2020; Tony Romo, 2014
 Most games, 140+ passer rating, season: 4, Jacky Lee, 1961; Roger Staubach, 1973; Tom Brady, 2007 and 2010; Aaron Rodgers 2011
 Most games, 150+ passer rating, season: 3, Drew Brees, 2018
 Most games, 158.3 perfect passer rating, season: 2, Ben Roethlisberger, 2007; Lamar Jackson, 2019
 Most seasons, 100+ passer rating (minimum 10 games started): 9, Drew Brees; 2004, 2009, 2011, 2013, 2015–2019
 Most seasons, 120+ passer rating (minimum 10 games started): 2, Aaron Rodgers 2011, 2020

Passing attempts 
 Most seasons led league: 5, Dan Marino, 1984, 1986, 1988, 1992, 1997
 Most consecutive seasons led league: 3, Johnny Unitas, 1959–1961; George Blanda, 1963–1965; Drew Bledsoe, 1994–1996
 Most pass attempts, career: 12,050, Tom Brady, 2000–2022.
 Most pass attempts, season: 733, Tom Brady, 2022.
 Most pass attempts, rookie, season: 627, Andrew Luck, 2012
 Most pass attempts, game: 70, Drew Bledsoe, Nov 13, 1994 (OT).
 Most pass attempts, regulation game: 69, Vinny Testaverde, Dec 24, 2000.
 Most pass attempts per game, career: 40.1, Justin Herbert, 2020–2022
 Most pass attempts per game, season: 45.44, Matthew Stafford, (727 attempts/16 games), 2012
 Most pass attempts, game, perfect passer rating (158.3): 33, Jared Goff, Sep 27, 2018; Deshaun Watson, Oct 6, 2019
 Most seasons, 500+ pass attempts: 17, Tom Brady, 2002–2022
 Most seasons, 550+ pass attempts: 14, Tom Brady; 2002, 2007, 2009, 2011–2015, 2017–2022

Pass completions 
 Most seasons led league: 6, Dan Marino; 1984–1986, 1988, 1992, 1997; Drew Brees; 2007–2008, 2011, 2014, 2016–2017
 Most consecutive seasons led league: 3, George Blanda, 1963–1965, Dan Marino, 1984–1986
 Most pass completions, career: 7,753, Tom Brady, 2000–2022.
 Most pass completions, season: 490, Tom Brady, 2022.
 Most pass completions per game, career: 26.9, Justin Herbert, 2020–2022
 Most pass completions per game, season: 29.44, Drew Brees, 2016
 Most pass completions, rookie, season: 396, Justin Herbert, 2020
 Most pass completions, rookie, game: 37, Joe Burrow on 9-17-2020; Justin Herbert on 11-22-2020
 Most seasons 300+ completions: 18, Tom Brady, 2000-2022; Brett Favre, 1992–2009.
 Most seasons 350+ completions: 14, Tom Brady, 2002–2022.
 Most seasons 400+ completions: 9, Drew Brees, 2007–2008, 2010–2016
 Most consecutive seasons 300+ completions: 18, Brett Favre, 1992–2009
 Most consecutive seasons 350+ completions: 13, Drew Brees, 2006–2018
 Most consecutive seasons 400+ completions: 7, Drew Brees, 2010–2016
 Most pass completions, playoff game: 47, Ben Roethlisberger, 01-10-2021
 Most pass completions, regulation game, regular season: 45, Jared Goff, 09-29-2019.
 Most pass completions, game, perfect passer rating (158.3): 28, Deshaun Watson, Oct 6, 2019
 Most consecutive pass completions: 25, Ryan Tannehill, Oct 18-25, 2015 (last 7 completions on Oct 18, 2015; first 18 completions on Oct 25, 2015); Nick Foles, Dec 30, 2018

Pass completion percentage 
 Most seasons led league: 8, Len Dawson; 1962, 1964–1969, 1975
 Most consecutive seasons led league: 6, Len Dawson, 1964–1969
 Highest completion percentage, career (minimum 1,500 attempts): 68.24, Joe Burrow (1,044 passing completions/1,530 attempts), 2020–2022.
 Highest completion percentage, season (among qualified players): 74.44, Drew Brees, (364/489), 2018
 Highest completion percentage, rookie, season: 67.76, Dak Prescott, (311/459), 2016
 Highest completion percentage, regular season game (minimum 20 attempts): 96.67, Drew Brees, (29/30), Dec 16, 2019
 Most games with at least 80% pass completion rate, career (minimum 20 attempts per game): 28, Drew Brees, 2004–2020
 Most games with at least 80% pass completion rate, season (minimum 20 attempts per game): 4, Drew Brees, 2018
 Most games with at least 80% pass completion rate and no interceptions, career (minimum 20 passes per game): 26, Drew Brees, 2004–2020.
 Most games with at least 80% pass completion rate and no interceptions, season (minimum 20 passes per game): 4, Drew Brees, 2018
 Most games with at least 75% pass completion rate, career (minimum 20 attempts per game): 67, Drew Brees, 2004–2020 
 Most games with at least 75% pass completion rate, season (minimum 20 attempts per game): 8, Tom Brady, 2007
 Most games with at least 75% pass completion rate and no interceptions, career (minimum 20 attempts per game): 51, Drew Brees, 2004–2020 
 Most games with at least 75% pass completion rate and no interceptions, season (minimum 20 attempts per game): 6, Tom Brady, 2007; Dak Prescott, 2016
 Most games with at least 70% pass completion rate, career (minimum 20 attempts per game): 116, Drew Brees, 2004–2020
 Most games with at least 70% pass completion rate, season (minimum 20 attempts per game): 13, Drew Brees, 2017
 Most games with at least 70% pass completion rate and no interceptions, career (minimum 20 attempts per game): 75, Drew Brees, 2004–2020
 Most seasons with at least 70% pass completion rate (minimum 100 attempts per season): 5, Drew Brees; 2009, 2011, 2016-2018
 Most seasons with at least 60% pass completion rate (minimum 100 attempts per season): 21, Tom Brady; 2001–2007, 2009–2022

Passing yards 
 Most seasons leading league: 7, Drew Brees, 2006, 2008, 2011–2012, 2014–2016
 Most consecutive seasons leading league: 4, Dan Fouts, 1979–1982
 Most passing yards, career: 89,214, Tom Brady, 2000–2022.
 Highest yards per game, career: 303.0, Patrick Mahomes, (24,241 yards/80 games), 2017–2022.
 Highest yards per game, season: 342.31, Peyton Manning, (5,477 yards/16 games), 2013
 Most seasons 2,000+ yards: 21, Tom Brady, 2001–2007; 2009–2022.
 Most seasons 2,500+ yards: 21, Tom Brady, 2001–2007, 2009–2022.
 Most seasons 3,000+ yards: 20, Tom Brady, 2002–2007, 2009–2022.
 Most seasons 3,500+ yards: 20, Tom Brady, 2002–2007, 2009–2022.
 Most seasons 4,000+ yards: 14, Peyton Manning; 1999–2004, 2006–2010, 2012–2014
 Most seasons 4,500+ yards: 8, Drew Brees, 2008, 2010–2016
 Most seasons 5,000+ yards: 5, Drew Brees; 2008, 2011–2013, 2016
 Most consecutive seasons 2,000+ yards: 19, Drew Brees, 2002–2020; Brett Favre, 1992–2010
 Most consecutive seasons 2,500+ yards: 19, Brett Favre, 1992–2010
 Most consecutive seasons 3,000+ yards: 18, Brett Favre, 1992–2009
 Most consecutive seasons 3,500+ yards: 14, Drew Brees, 2005–2018; Tom Brady, 2009-2022.
 Most consecutive seasons 4,000+ yards: 12, Drew Brees, 2006–2017
 Most consecutive seasons 4,500+ yards: 7, Drew Brees, 2010–2016
 Most consecutive seasons 5,000+ yards: 3, Drew Brees, 2011–2013
 Most passing yards, season: 5,477, Peyton Manning, 2013
 Most passing yards, rookie, season: 4,374, Andrew Luck, 2012
 Most passing yards, season, home: 2,853, Drew Brees, 2015
 Most passing yards, season, away: 2,852, Drew Brees, 2011
 Most passing yards, game: 554, Norm Van Brocklin, Sep 28, 1951.
 Most passing yards, combined, game: 1,000, Matthew Stafford, (520) and Matt Flynn, (480), Jan 1, 2012
 Most passing yards, 1st half: 361, Peyton Manning, Jan 9, 2005
 Most passing yards, 2nd half: 417, Kirk Cousins, December 17, 2022
 Most passing yards, overtime: 219, Derek Carr, Oct 30, 2016
 Most passing yards, game, perfect passer rating (158.3): 465, Jared Goff, Sep 27, 2018
 Most passing yards, game, rookie: 433, Andrew Luck, Nov 4, 2012
 Most games, 200+ yards passing, career: 238, Tom Brady, 2000–2021
 Most games, 250+ yards passing, career: 189, Tom Brady, 2001–2022
Most games, 300+ yards passing, career: 122, Drew Brees, 2002–2020
 Most games, 350+ yards passing, career: 63, Drew Brees, 2002–2019
Most games, 400+ yards passing, career: 16, Drew Brees, 2001–2018
 Most games, 450+ yards passing, career: 6, Ben Roethlisberger, 2009–2018
 Most games, 500+ yards passing, career: 3, Ben Roethlisberger, 2009–2017
 Most games, 250+ yards passing, season: 16, Drew Brees, 2011
 Most games, 300+ yards passing, season: 13, Drew Brees, 2011
 Most games, 350+ yards passing, season: 8, Drew Brees, 2011; Peyton Manning, 2013
 Most games, 400+ yards passing, season: 4, Dan Marino, 1984; Peyton Manning, 2013; Ryan Fitzpatrick, 2018
 Most consecutive 200+ yards passing games: 64, Matt Ryan, 2013–2017
 Most consecutive 250+ yards passing games: 18, Drew Brees, 2010–2012
 Most consecutive 300+ yards passing games: 9, Drew Brees (twice) 2011–2012, 2012–2013
 Most consecutive 300+ yards passing games as rookie: 3, Joe Burrow, 2020
 Most consecutive 350+ yards passing games: 4, Drew Brees, 2011; Matthew Stafford, 2011–2012
 Most consecutive 400+ yards passing games: 3, Ryan Fitzpatrick, 2018; Dak Prescott, 2020
 Most consecutive 450+ yards passing games: 3, Dak Prescott, 2020
 Longest pass completion: 99 yards, by 13 players, most recently Eli Manning, Dec 24, 2011
 Youngest player, 3,000 yards passing: Jameis Winston (21 years, 342 days) Dec 13, 2015
 Youngest player, 4,000 yards passing: Jameis Winston (21 years, 363 days) Jan 3, 2016
 Fewest games to reach 10,000 career passing yards: 34, Patrick Mahomes, 2017–2020
 Fewest games to reach 15,000 career passing yards: 49, Patrick Mahomes, 2017–2021
 Fewest games to reach 20,000 career passing yards: 67, Patrick Mahomes, 2017–2022
 Fewest games to reach 25,000 career passing yards: 90, Matthew Stafford, 2009–2015
 Fewest games to reach 30,000 career passing yards: 109, Matthew Stafford, 2009–2017
 Fewest games to reach 35,000 career passing yards: 126, Matthew Stafford, 2009–2018 
 Fewest games to reach 40,000 career passing yards: 147, Matthew Stafford, 2009–2019
 Fewest games to reach 45,000 career passing yards: 165, Matthew Stafford, 2009–2020
 Fewest games to reach 50,000 career passing yards: 183, Drew Brees, 2001–2013, Matthew Stafford, 2009–2022
 Fewest games to reach 55,000 career passing yards: 199, Drew Brees, 2001–2014
 Fewest games to reach 60,000 career passing yards: 215, Drew Brees, 2001–2015
 Fewest games to reach 65,000 career passing yards: 230, Drew Brees, 2001–2016
 Fewest games to reach 70,000 career passing yards: 248, Drew Brees, 2001–2017
 Fewest games to reach 75,000 career passing yards: 267, Drew Brees, 2001–2019
 Fewest games to reach 80,000 career passing yards: 286, Drew Brees, 2001–2020
 Fewest games to reach 85,000 career passing yards: 321, Tom Brady, 2001–2022

Average passing yards 
 Most seasons led league: 7, Sid Luckman, 1939–1943, 1946–47
 Most consecutive seasons led league: 5, Sid Luckman, 1939–1943
 Highest yards per attempt, career (minimum 1,500 attempts): 8.63 (13,499 yards on 1,565 attempts), Otto Graham, 1950–1955
 Highest yards per attempt, season (among qualified players): 11.17 (1,229 on 110 attempts), Tommy O'Connell, 1957
 Highest yards per attempt, rookie, season: 9.41 (1,854 yards on 197 attempts), Greg Cook, 1969
 Highest yards per attempt, game: 18.58 (446 yards on 24 attempts) Sammy Baugh, Oct 31, 1948

Passing touchdowns 
Career
Most passing touchdowns, career: 649, Tom Brady, 2000–2022.
 Most games 1+ TD passes, career: 289, Tom Brady, 2000–2022.
 Most red zone touchdown passes: 418, Tom Brady

Regular season
 Most seasons led league: 5, Tom Brady, 2002, 2007, 2010, 2015, 2021
 Most consecutive seasons led league: 4, Johnny Unitas, 1957–1960
 Most touchdown passes per game average, regular season: 2.400, Patrick Mahomes, (192 TD passes/80 games), 2017–2022.
 Most passing touchdowns, season: 55, Peyton Manning, 2013
 Most passing touchdowns, rookie, season: 31, Justin Herbert, 2020
 Most consecutive seasons, 1+ passing touchdowns: 21, Vinny Testaverde, 1987–2007
 Most consecutive seasons, 20+ passing touchdowns: 17, Drew Brees, 2004–2020
 Most consecutive seasons, 25+ passing touchdowns: 16, Peyton Manning, 1998–2014
 Most consecutive seasons, 30+ passing touchdowns: 9, Drew Brees, 2008–2016
 Most consecutive seasons, 35+ passing touchdowns: 3, Brett Favre, 1995–1997; Drew Brees, 2011–2013; Peyton Manning, 2012–2014
 Most consecutive seasons, 40+ passing touchdowns: 2, Drew Brees, 2011–2012, Tom Brady, 2020–2021
 Most seasons, 20+ passing touchdowns: 20, Tom Brady, 2002–2007, 2009–2022.
 Most seasons, 25+ passing touchdowns: 18, Tom Brady, 2002, 2004–2005, 2007, 2009–2022.
 Most seasons, 30+ passing touchdowns: 10, Drew Brees, 2008–2016, 2018
 Most seasons, 35+ passing touchdowns: 6, Tom Brady, 2007, 2010–2011, 2015, 2020–2021
 Most seasons, 40+ passing touchdowns: 3, Tom Brady 2007, 2020, 2021; Aaron Rodgers, 2011, 2016, 2020 
Most consecutive games, 1+ passing touchdowns: 54, Drew Brees, 2009–2012
Most consecutive uninterrupted games, 1+ passing touchdowns: 52, Tom Brady, 2010–2013
 Most consecutive passing touchdowns, no interceptions, home: 49, Aaron Rodgers

Game
Most passing touchdowns, game: 7, Sid Luckman, Nov 14, 1943; Adrian Burk, Oct 17, 1954; George Blanda, Nov 19, 1961; Y. A. Tittle, Oct 28, 1962; Joe Kapp, Sep 28, 1969; Peyton Manning, Sep 5, 2013; Nick Foles, Nov 3, 2013; Drew Brees, Nov 1, 2015
 Most passing touchdowns, one half: 6, Daryle Lamonica, Oct 19, 1969; Aaron Rodgers, Nov 9, 2014
 Most passing touchdowns, rookie, one half: 4, Marcus Mariota, Sep 13, 2015; Jameis Winston, Nov 22, 2015
 Most passing touchdowns, one quarter: 5, Tom Brady, Oct 18, 2009
 Most passing touchdowns, no interceptions, game: 7, Y. A. Tittle, Oct 28, 1962; Peyton Manning, Sep 5, 2013; Nick Foles, Nov 3, 2013
 Most passing touchdowns, perfect passer rating (158.3), game: 7 Nick Foles, Nov 3, 2013
 Highest percentage of touchdown passes out of pass attempts, game: 35.29, Daryle Lamonica, (6 TD passes/17 attempts), Dec 21, 1969
 Most games, 1+ passing touchdowns: 291, Tom Brady, 2001–2022.
 Most games, 2+ passing touchdowns: 204, Tom Brady, 2001–2022.
 Most games, 3+ passing touchdowns: 104, Tom Brady, 2001–2022.
 Most games, 4+ passing touchdowns: 39, Tom Brady, 2001–2022.
 Most games, 5+ passing touchdowns: 11, Drew Brees, 2004–2019.
 Most games, 6+ passing touchdowns: 3, Peyton Manning, 2003–2013.
 Fewest games to reach 100 touchdown passes: 40, Patrick Mahomes, 2017–2020.
 Fewest games to reach 200 touchdown passes: 89, Dan Marino, 1983–1989
 Fewest games to reach 300 touchdown passes: 144, Aaron Rodgers, 2005–2017
 Fewest games to reach 400 touchdown passes: 192, Aaron Rodgers, 2005–2020
 Fewest games to reach 500 touchdown passes: 244, Peyton Manning, 1998–2014
 Fewest games to reach 600 touchdown passes: 308, Tom Brady, 2001–2021.

Interceptions thrown 
 Most seasons led league: 4, Vinny Testaverde, 1988–1989, 2000, 2004
 Most passes intercepted, career: 336, Brett Favre, 1991–2010
 Most passes intercepted, season: 42, George Blanda, 1962
 Most passes intercepted, rookie season: 28, Peyton Manning, 1998
 Most passes intercepted, game: 8, Jim Hardy, September 24, 1950
 Most passes intercepted, half: 5, Nathan Peterman, November 20, 2017
 Most consecutive passes attempted, none intercepted: 402, Aaron Rodgers, September 30, 2018–December 16, 2018
 Most consecutive passes attempted, none intercepted to start a career: 176, Dak Prescott, 2016.
 Most consecutive passes attempted, none intercepted to start a season: 287, Alex Smith, 2017
 Most attempts with no interceptions, game: 70 Drew Bledsoe, November 13, 1994
 Most completions with no interceptions, game: 45 Drew Bledsoe, November 13, 1994
 Most games with 200+ yards passing and no interceptions, career: 123, Tom Brady, 2001–2019
 Most games with 200+ yards passing and no interceptions, season: 11, Tom Brady, 2012; Aaron Rodgers, 2014
 Most consecutive touchdowns, and no interceptions, home: 49, Aaron Rodgers
 Most games with 1+ touchdown passes and no interceptions, career: 134, Tom Brady, 2001–2019
 Most games with 1+ touchdown passes and no interceptions, season: 14, Tom Brady 2010
 Most consecutive games with 1+ touchdown passes and no interceptions: 11, Tom Brady, 2010

Lowest interception percentage 
 Most seasons led league, interception percentage: 5, Sammy Baugh, 1940, 1942, 1944–45, 1947
 Lowest interception percentage, career (minimum 1,500 attempts): 1.37 (105 INTs, 7,660 attempts), Aaron Rodgers, 2005–2022.
 Lowest interception percentage, season (minimum 200 attempts): 0.0 (0 INTs, 200 attempts), Brian Hoyer, 2016
 Lowest interception percentage, season (minimum 16 starts): 0.335 (2 INTs, 597 attempts), Aaron Rodgers, 2018
 Lowest interception percentage, rookie season: 0.87 (4 INTs, 459 attempts), Dak Prescott, 2016

Sacked 
 Most times sacked, career: 564, Tom Brady, 2001–2022. 572, Fran Tarkenton (unofficial).
 Most times sacked, season: 76, David Carr, 2002
 Most times sacked, game: 12, Bert Jones, October 26, 1980; Warren Moon, September 29, 1985; Donovan McNabb, September 30, 2007
 Most sack yards lost, career: 3,794, Dave Krieg
 Lowest sacked percentage (times sacked per passing play attempted), season: 1.18% (3 times sacked, 255 passing plays), Steve Walsh, 1991
 Lowest sacked percentage (times sacked per passing play attempted), career: 3.13%, Peyton Manning and Dan Marino

Receiving

Receptions 
 Most seasons leading league: 8, Don Hutson, 1936–37, 1939, 1941–1945
 Most consecutive seasons leading league: 5, Don Hutson, 1941–1945
 Most pass receptions, career: 1,549, Jerry Rice, 1985–2004
 Most pass receptions, season: 149, Michael Thomas, 2019
 Most pass receptions, rookie, season: 104, Jaylen Waddle, 2021
 Most pass receptions, season, tight end: 113, Zach Ertz, 2018
 Most pass receptions, season, running back: 116, Christian McCaffrey, 2019
 Most pass receptions, game: 21, Brandon Marshall, December 13, 2009
 Most pass receptions, game, rookie: 14, Roy Helu, Nov 6, 2011, Saquon Barkley, Sep 16, 2018
 Most pass receptions, half: 13, Jason Witten, October 28, 2012
 Highest reception average per game, career: 7.46, Michael Thomas, (470 receptions/63 games), 2016–2019
 Highest reception average per game, season: 9.31, Michael Thomas, (149 receptions/16 games), 2019
 Most consecutive games, 1+ pass receptions: 274, Jerry Rice 1985–2004
 Most consecutive seasons, 50+ pass receptions: 17, Larry Fitzgerald 2004–2020
 Most consecutive seasons, 100+ pass receptions: 6, Antonio Brown 2013–2018
 Most seasons, 50+ pass receptions: 17, Jerry Rice 1986–2003
 Most seasons, 100+ pass receptions: 6, Brandon Marshall 2007–2015, Antonio Brown 2013–2018
 Most seasons, 120+ pass receptions: 2, Michael Thomas 2018–2019, Antonio Brown 2014–2015, Wes Welker 2009–2011, Cris Carter 1994–1995
 Most games, 10+ pass receptions, season: 9, Michael Thomas 2019
 Most games, 15+ pass receptions, season: 2, Antonio Brown 2015
 Most games, 1+ reception, career: 296, Jerry Rice 1985–2004
 Most games, 5+ receptions, career: 166, Jerry Rice 1985–2004
 Most games, 10+ receptions, career: 23, Antonio Brown 2010–2021
 Most games, 15+ receptions, career: 2, Brandon Marshall 2008–2018, Wes Welker 2009–2014, Jason Witten 2007–2017, Antonio Brown 2010–2015

Yards receiving 

 Most seasons leading league: 7, Don Hutson, 1936, 1938–39, 1941–1944
 Most consecutive seasons leading league: 4, Don Hutson, 1941–1944
 Most receiving yards, career: 22,895, Jerry Rice 1985–2004
 Most receiving yards per game average, career: 96.5, Justin Jefferson, (4,825 yards/50 games), 2020–present
 Most receiving yards per game average, season: 129.0, Wes Chandler, (1,032 yards/8 games), 1982
 Most receiving yards per game average, rookie season: 108.8, Odell Beckham Jr., (1,305 yards/12 Games), 2014
 Most seasons 500 or more yards receiving: 18, Jerry Rice 1985–2003
 Most seasons 1,000 or more yards receiving: 14, Jerry Rice, 1986–2002
 Most seasons 1,500 or more yards receiving: 4, Jerry Rice 1986–1995
 Most consecutive seasons 500 or more yards receiving: 16, Tony Gonzalez 1998–2013; Larry Fitzgerald 2004–2019
 Most consecutive seasons 1,000 or more yards receiving: 11, Jerry Rice 1986–1996
 Most consecutive seasons 1,500 or more yards receiving: 2, Marvin Harrison 2001–2002, Andre Johnson 2008–2009, Calvin Johnson 2011–2012, Antonio Brown 2014–2015, Julio Jones 2014–2015
Most consecutive seasons, 1,000+ receiving yards, TE: Travis Kelce (7, 2016–2022)
 Most receiving yards, season: 1,964, Calvin Johnson, 2012
 Most receiving yards, two seasons, to start a career: 3,016, Justin Jefferson, 2020–2021
 Most receiving yards, rookie, season: 1,473, Bill Groman (AFL), 1960
 Most receiving yards, season, TE: 1,416, Travis Kelce, 2020
 Most receiving yards, season, RB: 1,048, Marshall Faulk, 1999
 Most receiving yards, game: 336, Flipper Anderson, Nov. 26, 1989 (OT)
 Most receiving yards, regulation game: 329, Calvin Johnson, 10-27-2013
 Most receiving yards, game, rookie: 266, Ja’Marr Chase, January 2, 2022
 Most receiving yards, game, TE: 214, Shannon Sharpe, Oct 20, 2002
 Most receiving yards, one half: 258, Stephone Paige, Dec 22, 1985
 Most receiving yards, one quarter: 210, Qadry Ismail, Dec 12, 1999
 Most games, 50+ receiving yards, career: 198, Jerry Rice, 1985–2004
 Most games, 100+ receiving yards, career: 76, Jerry Rice, 1985–2004
 Most games, 150+ receiving yards, career: 30, Jerry Rice, 1985–2003
 Most games, 200+ receiving yards, career: 5; Lance Alworth, 1963–1967; Calvin Johnson, 2007–2015
 Most games, 250+ receiving yards, career: 3; Julio Jones, 2014–17
 Most games, 50+ receiving yards, season: 16, Antonio Brown 2013–14
 Most games, 100+ receiving yards, season: 11, Michael Irvin 1995, Calvin Johnson 2012
 Most games, 150+ receiving yards, season: 5; Tim Brown, 1997; Jerry Rice, 1995; Roy Green, 1984; Antonio Brown, 2017;
 Most games, 200+ receiving yards, season: 3, Charley Hennigan (AFL), 1961
 Most consecutive games, 50+ receiving yards: 35, Antonio Brown 2013–2015
 Most consecutive games, 100+ receiving yards: 8, Calvin Johnson 2012, Adam Thielen 2018
 Most consecutive games, 125+ receiving yards: 5, Calvin Johnson 2012, Pat Studstill 1966
 Most consecutive games, 150+ receiving yards: 3, Josh Gordon 2013, Isaac Bruce 1995, Andre Rison 1990, Roy Green 1984, James Lofton 1984, Don Maynard 1968
 Most consecutive games, 200+ receiving yards: 2, Josh Gordon 2013
 Fewest games to reach 6,000 receiving yards, TE: 91, Travis Kelce
 Fewest games to reach 8,000 receiving yards, TE: 113, Travis Kelce
 Fewest games to reach 9,000 receiving yards, TE: 127, Travis Kelce
 Fewest games to 10,000 career receiving yards, TE: 140, Travis Kelce
 Longest pass reception (see also 99–yard pass play): 99, by 12 players, most recently Victor Cruz, December 24, 2011

Average yards/reception 
 Highest yards/reception, career (minimum 200 receptions): 22.26 (4,996 yards / 224 receptions), Homer Jones, 1964–70
 Highest yards/reception, season (minimum 24 receptions): 32.58 (782 yards / 24 receptions), Don Currivan, 1947
 Highest yards/reception, game (minimum 3 receptions): 63.00 (189 yards / 3 receptions), Torry Holt, September 24, 2000

Receiving touchdowns 

 Most seasons led league: 9, Don Hutson, 1935–1938, 1940–1944
 Most consecutive seasons led league: 5, Don Hutson, 1940–1944
 Most touchdowns, career: 197, Jerry Rice, 1985–2004
 Most touchdowns, season: 23, Randy Moss, 2007
 Most touchdowns for a TE, season; 17, Rob Gronkowski, 2011
 Most touchdowns for a RB, season; 9, Billy Cannon, 1961; Bill Brown, 1964; Chuck Foreman, 1975; Leroy Hoard, 1991; Marshall Faulk, 2001
 Most touchdowns, rookie season: 17, Randy Moss, 1998
 Most touchdowns, season, home: 13, Jerry Rice, 1987; Marvin Harrison, 2001; Jordy Nelson, 2011
 Most touchdowns, season, away: 14, Randy Moss, 2007
 Most touchdowns, back-to-back games: 7, Cloyce Box, Nov 23, 1950 – Dec 3, 1950
 Most touchdowns, game: 5, Bob Shaw, October 2, 1950, Jerry Rice, October 14, 1990; Kellen Winslow, November 22, 1981
 Most touchdowns, one half: 4, Don Hutson, Oct 7, 1945; Dante Lavelli, Oct 14, 1949; Bob Shaw, Oct 2, 1950; Harold Jackson, Oct 14, 1973; Paul Warfield Dec 15, 1973; Ahmad Rashad, Sep 2, 1979; Roy Green, Nov 13, 1983; Mark Ingram, Nov 27, 1994; Marcus Robinson, Nov 23, 2003; Randy Moss, Nov 18, 2007
 Most touchdowns, one quarter: 4, Don Hutson, Oct 7, 1945
 Most consecutive games, 1+ TD receptions: 13, Jerry Rice, 1986–1987
 Most games 1+ TD receptions, career: 139, Jerry Rice, 1985–2004
 Most games 1+ TD receptions, season: 13, Mark Clayton, 1984; Jerry Rice, 1989; Carl Pickens, 1995; Randy Moss, 2007
 Most consecutive seasons, 1+ TD receptions: 20, Jerry Rice, 1985–2004
 Most consecutive seasons, 5+ TD receptions: 11, Terrell Owens, 2000–2010; Marvin Harrison, 1996–2006; Cris Carter, 1991–2001; Tim Brown, 1991–2001; Jerry Rice, 1986–1996; Don Hutson, 1935–1945
 Most consecutive seasons, 10+ TD receptions: 8, Marvin Harrison, 1999–2006
 Most seasons with at least 1 touchdown reception: 20, Jerry Rice
 Most seasons with at least 5 touchdown receptions: 16, Jerry Rice
 Most seasons with at least 10 touchdown receptions: 9, Jerry Rice; Randy Moss
 Most seasons with at least 15 touchdown receptions: 5, Jerry Rice
 Most seasons with at least 20 touchdown receptions: 1, Randy Moss, Jerry Rice
 Most touchdown receptions, 20+ yards, game 4, Cloyce Box, 12-03-1950; Art Powell, 12-22-1963; Wesley Walker, 9-21-1986
 Fewest games to reach 50 career touchdown receptions: 54, Lance Alworth 1962–1966

Yards from scrimmage 

 Most seasons leading the league in yards from scrimmage, 6 Jim Brown, 1958–1959, 1961, 1963–1965
 Most consecutive seasons leading the league in yards from scrimmage, 4 Thurman Thomas, 1989–1992
 Most yards from scrimmage, career: 23,540, Jerry Rice, 1985–2004
 Most yards from scrimmage, season: 2,509, Chris Johnson, 2009
 Most yards from scrimmage, no fumbles, season: 2,189, Marshall Faulk, 2000
 Most yards from scrimmage, rookie, season: 2,212, Eric Dickerson, 1983
 Highest average yards from scrimmage per game, career (100 games): 125.52, Jim Brown (14,811 yards/118 games), 1957–1965
 Highest average yards from scrimmage per game, season: 163.36, Priest Holmes (2,237 yards/14 games),  2002
 Most attempts, season: 492, (407 rushes, 85 receptions), James Wilder Sr., 1984
 Most attempts, rookie, season: 441, (390 rushes, 51 receptions), Eric Dickerson, 1983
 Most attempts, no fumbles, season: 430 (397 rushes, 33 receptions), Gerald Riggs, 1985
 Most combined attempts, game: 48, James Wilder Sr. (42 rushes, 6 receptions), October 30, 1983 and LaDainian Tomlinson (37 rushes, 11 receptions), December 1, 2002 (OT)
 Most yards from scrimmage, game: 336, (all receiving yards), Flipper Anderson, Nov. 26, 1989 (OT)
 Most yards from scrimmage, non-overtime game: 330, Billy Cannon, Dec. 10, 1961
 Most yards from scrimmage, back-to-back games: 525, Walter Payton, Nov 20, 1977 – Nov 24, 1977
 Most games, 50 yards from scrimmage, career: 202, Jerry Rice 1985–2004
 Most games, 100 yards from scrimmage, career: 108, Walter Payton, 1975–1987
 Most games, 150 yards from scrimmage, career: 46, Barry Sanders, 1989–1998
 Most games, 200 yards from scrimmage, career: 14, Marshall Faulk, 1994–2005
 Most games, 250 yards from scrimmage, career: 5, Marshall Faulk, 1994–2005
 Most games, 100 yards from scrimmage, season: 15, Marcus Allen, 1985; Barry Sanders, 1997; Edgerrin James, 2000; David Johnson 2016
 Most games, 150 yards from scrimmage, season: 10, Chris Johnson, 2009
 Most games, 200 yards from scrimmage, season: 5, LaDainian Tomlinson, 2003
 Most games, 250 yards from scrimmage, season: 2, Marshall Faulk, 2000
 Most consecutive games, 100 yards from scrimmage: 17, Marcus Allen, 1985–1986
 Most consecutive games, 200 yards from scrimmage: 3, Le'Veon Bell, Nov 17, 2014, Nov 30, 2014, Dec 7, 2014. Walter Payton, Nov 13, 1977, Nov 20, 1977, Nov 24, 1977
 Most consecutive seasons, 500 or more yards from scrimmage: 16, Tony Gonzalez, 1998–2013
 Most seasons, 500 or more yards from scrimmage: 18, Jerry Rice, 1985–1996, 1998–2003
 Most consecutive seasons, 1000 or more yards from scrimmage: 13, Emmitt Smith, 1990–2002
 Most seasons, 1000 or more yards from scrimmage: 14, Emmitt Smith 1990–2002, 2004, Jerry Rice 1986–1996, 1998, 2001–2002
 Most consecutive seasons, 1500 or more yards from scrimmage: 8, LaDainian Tomlinson, 2001–2008
 Most seasons, 1500 or more yards from scrimmage: 10, Walter Payton 1976–1981, 1983–1986
 Most consecutive seasons, 2000 or more yards from scrimmage: 4, Marshall Faulk 1998–2001
 Most seasons, 2000 or more yards from scrimmage: 4, Marshall Faulk 1998–2001, Eric Dickerson 1983–84, 1986, 1988, Walter Payton 1977, 1983–85

All-purpose 

All-purpose yardage (or combined net yards gained) encompasses rushing, receiving, interception returns, punt returns, kickoff returns and fumble returns.

 Most seasons leading league, combined net yards: 5, Jim Brown, 1958–61, 1964
 Most consecutive seasons leading league, combined net yards: 4, Jim Brown, 1958–1961

All-purpose attempts 
 Most combined attempts, career: 4,939, Emmitt Smith (4,409 rushes, 515 receptions, 15 fumble returns), 1990–2004
 Most combined attempts, season: 492, James Wilder Sr.  (407 rushes, 85 receptions, 0 returns), 1984
 Most combined attempts, no fumbles, season: 430, Gerald Riggs (397 rushes, 33 receptions), 1985
 Most combined attempts, rookie, season: 441, Eric Dickerson (390 rushes, 51 receptions, 0 returns), 1983 
 Most combined attempts per fumble, career, minimum 2,000 attempts: 138.0, Curtis Martin, 1995–2005
 Most combined attempts per fumble, career, minimum 1,000 attempts: 199.88, Ray Rice, 2008–2013
 Most consecutive combined attempts, no fumbles: 870, Steven Jackson (755 rushes, 115 receptions), Nov 3, 2011-January 3, 2016 (end of career)
 Most combined attempts, no fumbles, career: 446, Darnay Scott (408 receptions, 22 rushes, 15 kickoff returns, 1 fumble return), 1994–2002
 Most consecutive combined attempts, no fumbles to start a career: 589, BenJarvus Green-Ellis (559 rushes, 30 receptions), 2008–2012
 Most combined attempts, game: 48, James Wilder Sr. (42 rushes, 6 receptions), on October 30, 1983 and LaDainian Tomlinson (37 rushes, 11 receptions), on December 1, 2002 (OT)

All-purpose yards 
 Most yards gained, career: 23,546, Jerry Rice, 1985–2004
 Most yards gained, total, season: 2,696, Darren Sproles, 2011
 Highest average yards per game, season: 175.9, Terry Metcalf (2,462 yards/13 games), 1975
 Highest average yards per game, career: 138.8, Gale Sayers (9,435 yards/68 games), 1965–1971
 Most yards gained, total, season, home: 1,508, Chris Johnson, 2009
 Most yards gained, total, season, away: 1,455, Timmy Brown, 1962
 Most yards gained, total, rookie, season: 2,317, Tim Brown, 1988
 Most yards gained, no fumbles, season: 2,215, Le'Veon Bell, 2014
 Most yards gained, total, game: 404, Glyn Milburn; Dec 10, 1995
 Most games, 50 yards gained, career: 202, Jerry Rice 1985–2004
 Most games, 100 yards gained, career: 118, Brian Mitchell 1990–2003
 Most games, 150 yards gained, career: 46, Walter Payton 1975–1986, Barry Sanders 1989–1998
 Most games, 200 yards gained, career: 17, Darren Sproles 2007–2019
 Most games, 250 yards gained, career: 7, Terry Metcalf 1974–1977
 Most games, 300 yards gained, career: 2, Jacoby Ford 2010, Josh Cribbs 2007–2009, Adrian Peterson 2007, Lionel James 1985, Gale Sayers 1965–1966
 Most games, 1 yard gained, season: 17, Dexter Carter 1995
 Most games, 100 yards gained, season: 15, David Johnson 2016, Michael Lewis 2002, Edgerrin James 2000, MarTay Jenkins 2000, Derrick Mason 2000, Barry Sanders 1997, Marcus Allen 1985
 Most games, 150 yards gained, season: 11, Michael Lewis 2002, Terry Metcalf 1975, Darren Sproles 2011
 Most games, 200 yards gained, season: 5, Fred Jackson 2009, Josh Cribbs 2009, LaDainian Tomlinson 2003, Walter Payton 1977, Timmy Brown 1962, Terry Metcalf 1975
 Most games, 250 yards gained, season: 3, Timmy Brown 1962, Lionel James 1985, Terry Metcalf 1977
 Most games, 300 yards gained, season: 2, Jacoby Ford 2010, Adrian Peterson 2007, Lionel James 1985
 Most consecutive games, 100 or more yards: 23, Gale Sayers, 1965–1967
 Most consecutive games, 200 or more yards: 4, Darren Sproles, 2008–2009
 Most consecutive seasons, 1000 or more yards: 13, Emmitt Smith, 1990–2002
 Most seasons, 1000 or more yards: 14, Emmitt Smith 1990–2002, 2004, Jerry Rice 1986–1996, 1998, 2001–2002
 Most consecutive seasons, 1500 or more yards: 9, Brian Mitchell, 1994–2002
 Most seasons, 1500 or more yards: 10, Walter Payton 1976–1981, 1983–1986
 Most consecutive seasons, 2000 or more yards: 4, Marshall Faulk 1998–2001; Dante Hall 2002–2005; Darren Sproles 2008–2011
 Most seasons, 2000 or more yards: 4, Walter Payton 1977, 1983–1985; Eric Dickerson 1983–1984, 1986, 1988; Brian Mitchell 1994–1995, 1997–1998; Marshall Faulk 1998–2001; Dante Hall 2002–2005; Tiki Barber 2000, 2004–2006; Darren Sproles 2008–2011

Interceptions 
 Most seasons leading league: 3; Everson Walls, 1981–82, 1985; Ed Reed, 2004, 2008, 2010
 Most interceptions, career: 81, Paul Krause, 1964–79
 Most interceptions, season: 14, Dick "Night Train" Lane, 1952
 Most interceptions, rookie, season: 14, Dick "Night Train" Lane, 1952
 Most interceptions, game: 4, by 19 players, most recently DeAngelo Hall, October 24, 2010
 Most interceptions, one half: 4, DeAngelo Hall, October 24, 2010
 Most consecutive games with an interception: 8, Tom Morrow, 1962–63
 Most consecutive seasons with an interception: 19, Darrell Green, Washington Redskins, 1983–2001

Interception return yards 
 Most seasons leading league: 3, Darren Sharper, 2002, 2005, 2009
 Most interception return yards, career: 1,590, Ed Reed, 2002–2013
 Most yards per interception return, career (minimum 30 interceptions): 25.1 (1,331 yards/53 INTS), Deion Sanders, 1989–2000, 2004–2005
 Most yards per interception return, career (minimum 20 interceptions): 27.6 (608 yards/22 INTS), Erik McMillan, 1989–1993
 Most interception return yards, season: 376, Darren Sharper, New Orleans Saints, 2009
 Most interception return yards, rookie, season: 301, Don Doll, Detroit Lions, 1949
 Most interception return yards, game: 177, Charlie McNeil, September 24, 1961
 Longest interception return: 108, Ed Reed, November 23, 2008

Interception return touchdowns 
 Most interceptions returned for touchdowns, career: 12, Rod Woodson, 1987–2003
 Most interceptions returned for touchdowns, season: 4; Ken Houston, 1971; Jim Kearney, 1972; Eric Allen 1993
 Most interceptions returned for touchdowns, rookie, season: 3; Lem Barney, 1967; Ronnie Lott, 1981; Janoris Jenkins 2012
 Most interceptions returned for touchdowns, game: 2, by 30 players, most recently Zach Brown, December 30, 2012
 Most consecutive seasons with an interception returned for a touchdown: 6, Charles Woodson, Green Bay Packers, 2006–2011

Punting 
 Most seasons leading league: 4, Sammy Baugh, 1940–43; Jerrel Wilson, 1965, 1968, 1972–73
 Most consecutive seasons leading league: 4, Sammy Baugh, 1940–43

Punts 
 Most punts, career: 1,713, Jeff Feagles 1988–2009
 Most punts, season: 114, Bob Parsons, 1981 and Chad Stanley, 2002
 Most punts, rookie, season: 111, Brad Maynard 1997
 Most punts, game: 16, Leo Araguz on October 11, 1998
 Longest punt: 98 yards, Steve O'Neal on September 21, 1969

Punting yards 
 Most punting yardage, career: 71,211, Jeff Feagles, 1988–2009
 Most punting yardage, season: 5,209, Dave Zastudil, 2012
 Most punting yardage, rookie, season: 4,779, Ryan Stonehouse, 2022.
 Most punting yardage, game: 709, Leo Araguz on October 11, 1998

Average punting yards 
 Highest average, punting, career (minimum 250 punts): 47.56 (1,444 punts/68,676 yards), Shane Lechler, 2000–2017
 Highest average, punting, season (among qualified players): 53.10 (90 punts/4,779 yards), Ryan Stonehouse, 2022.
 Highest average, punting, rookie, season (among qualified players): 53.10 (90 punts/4,779 yards), Ryan Stonehouse, 2022.
 Highest average, punting, game (minimum 4 punts): 61.75 (4 punts/247 yards), Bob Cifers on 11-24-1946

Average net punting yards 
Net average has been compiled since 1976.
 Highest net average, career (minimum 250 punts): 41.1 (488 punts for 22,497 net yards), Pat McAfee, 2009–2016
 Highest net average, season (among qualified players): 44.23 (78 punts for 3,450 net yards), John Hekker, 2013
 Highest net average, rookie, season (among qualified players): 40.85 (92 punts for 3,758 net yards), Bryan Anger, 2012
 Highest net average game (minimum 4 punts): 59.50 (4 punts for 238 net yards), Rohn Stark on September 13, 1992

Punts had blocked 
 Most consecutive punts, none blocked: 1,177, Chris Gardocki, 1992–2006
 Most punts had blocked, career: 14; Herman Weaver, 1970–80; Harry Newsome, 1985–93
 Most punts had blocked, season: 6, Harry Newsome,

Punts inside the 20 
Punts inside the 20 have been compiled since 1976.
 Most punts inside the 20, career: 554, Jeff Feagles, 1988–2009
 Most punts inside the 20, season: 46, Dave Zastudil, 2012
 Most punts inside the 20, game: 8; Mark Royals on November 6, 1994; Bryan Barker on November 14, 1999

Punt returns

Punt return attempts 
 Most seasons leading league in number of punt returns: 3, Les "Speedy" Duncan, 1965–66, 1971; Rick Upchurch, 1976, 1978, 1982
 Most punt returns, career: 463, Brian Mitchell, 1990–2003
 Most punt returns, season: 70, Danny Reece, 1979
 Most punt returns, rookie, season: 57, Lew Barnes, 1986
 Most punt returns, game: 11, Eddie Brown on October 9, 1977

Fair catches 
 Most fair catches, career: 231, Brian Mitchell, 1990–2003
 Most fair catches, season: 36, Jeremy Kerley, 2012
 Most fair catches, game: 7; Bake Turner on November 20, 1966, Lem Barney on November 21, 1976, Bobby Morse on December 27, 1967 and Chris Carr on November 16, 2008

Punt return yards 
 Most seasons leading league: 3, Alvin Haymond, 1965–66, 1969
 Most yards gained, career: 4,999, Brian Mitchell, 1990–2003
 Most yards gained, season: 875, Desmond Howard, 1996
 Most yards gained, rookie, season: 699, Patrick Peterson, Arizona Cardinals, 2011
 Most yards gained, game: 207, LeRoy Irvin on October 11, 1981
 Longest punt return: 103, Robert Bailey on October 23, 1994

Average punt return yards 
 Highest average yardage, career (minimum 75 returns): 12.78 (112 returns for 1,431 yards), George McAfee, 1940–1950
 Highest average yardage, season (among qualified players): 23.00, Herb Rich, 1950
 Highest average yardage, highest average, season, rookie (among qualified players): 23.00, Herb Rich, 1950
 Highest average yardage, game (minimum 3 returns): 53.33, Darius Reynaud on December 30, 2012

Punt return touchdowns 
 Most punts returned for touchdown, career: 14 Devin Hester, Chicago Bears, 2006–2013, Atlanta Falcons, 2014–2015
 Most punts returned for touchdown, season: 4; Jack Christiansen, 1951; Rick Upchurch, 1976; Devin Hester, 2007; Patrick Peterson, 2011
 Most punts returned for touchdown, rookie, season: 4, Jack Christiansen, 1951; Patrick Peterson, 2011
 Most punts returned for touchdown, game: 2, 16 times by 13 players, most recently Darius Reynaud on December 30, 2012
 Most games with two or more punts returned for touchdowns: 2; Jack Christiansen October 14, 1951 and November 22, 1951; Eric Metcalf October 24, 1993 and November 2, 1997; Jermaine Lewis December 7, 1997 and December 24, 2000

Kickoff returns

Kickoff return attempts 
 Most seasons leading league: 3, Abe Woodson, 1959, 1962–63
 Most kickoff returns, career: 607, Brian Mitchell, 1990–2003
 Most kickoff returns, season: 82, MarTay Jenkins, 2000
 Most kickoff returns, rookie, season: 73; Josh Scobey 2003; Chris Carr, 2005
 Most kickoff returns, game: 10, Desmond Howard on October 26, 1997 and Richard Alston on November 28, 2004

Kickoff return yards 
 Most seasons leading league: 3; Bruce Harper, 1977–1979; Tyrone Hughes, 1994–1996
 Most yards gained, career: 14,014, Brian Mitchell, 1990–2003
 Most yards gained, season: 2,186, MarTay Jenkins, 2000
 Most yards gained, rookie, season: 1,752, Chris Carr, 2005
 Most yards gained, game: 304, Tyrone Hughes on October 23, 1994
 Longest kickoff return: 109 yards, Cordarrelle Patterson on October 27, 2013

Average kickoff return yards 
 Highest average, career (minimum 75 returns): 30.56 (91 returns for 2,781 yards), Gale Sayers, 1965–1971
 Highest average, season (among qualified players): 41.06 (18 returns for 739 yards), Travis Williams, 1967
 Highest average, rookie, season (among qualified players): 41.06 (18 returns for 739 yards), Travis Williams, 1967
 Highest average, game (minimum 3 returns): 73.50 (4 returns for 294 yards), Wally Triplett on October 29, 1950

Kickoff return touchdowns 
 Most touchdowns, career: 9, Cordarrelle Patterson, 2013–2022
 Most touchdowns, season: 4; Travis Williams, 1967; Cecil Turner, 1970
 Most touchdowns, rookie season: 4, Travis Williams, 1967
 Kickoff returns, most touchdowns, game: 2; by 10 players, most recently Leon Washington on September 26, 2010.
 Kickoff returns, most touchdowns, quarter: 2; Travis Williams, 1967 Green Bay Packers vs. Cleveland Browns

Combined kick/punt returns 

 Most seasons leading the league in combined returns: 3, Vai Sikahema, 1987, 1989, 1992
 Most combined kick returns, career: 1,070 (463 punt, 607 kickoff), Brian Mitchell, 1990–2003
 Most combined kick returns, season: 114; Michael Lewis, 2002 (44 punt, 70 kickoff); B. J. Sams, 2004 (55 punt, 59 kickoff)
 Most combined kick returns, rookie, season: 114 (55 punt, 59 kickoff), B. J. Sams, 2004
 Most combined kick returns, game: 13; Stump Mitchell on October 18, 1981 (6 punt, 7 kickoff) and Ronnie Harris on December 5, 1993 (10 punt, 3 kickoff)

Kick/punt return yards 
 Most seasons leading the league in combined return yards: 3, Tyrone Hughes 1993, 1995, 1996; Mel Gray 1990–1992, Vai Sikahema, 1986–1987, 1989
 Most consecutive seasons leading the league in combined return yards: 3, Mel Gray 1990–1992
 Most yards returned, career: 19,013 (4,999 punt, 14,014 kickoff), Brian Mitchell, 1990–2003
 Most yards returned, season: 2,432 (625 punt, 1,807 kickoff), Michael Lewis, 2002
 Most yards returned, rookie, season: 1,938, Chris Carr, 2005
 Most yards returned, game: 347 (43 punt, 304 kickoff), Tyrone Hughes on October 23, 1994

Kick/punt return touchdowns 
 Most touchdowns, career: 19 (14 punt, 5 kickoff), Devin Hester, 2006–2014
 Most touchdowns, season: 6 (4 punt, 2 kickoff), Devin Hester, 2007
 Most touchdowns, rookie, season: 5 (3 punt, 2 kickoff), Devin Hester, 2006
 Most touchdowns, game (any combination of kickoff and punt returns): 2; 39 times by 33 players, most recently Jeremy Ross on December 8, 2013 (1 punt, 1 kickoff)
 Most touchdowns, game (with both a kickoff and a punt for a TD) : 2; by 13 players, most recently Jeremy Ross on December 8, 2013

Fumbles 
 Most fumbles, career: 166, Brett Favre, 1991–2010
 Most fumbles, season: 23; Kerry Collins, 2001; Daunte Culpepper, 2002
 Most fumbles, game: 7, Len Dawson, November 15, 1964

Fumbles recovered 
 Most fumbles recovered, career, own and opponents' : 56 (all own), Warren Moon, 1984–2000
 Most fumbles recovered, season, own and opponents' : 12 (all own), David Carr, 2002
 Most fumbles recovered, game, own and opponents' : 4,
Otto Graham on October 25, 1953 (all own)
Sam Etcheverry on September 17, 1961 (all own)
Roman Gabriel on October 12, 1969 (all own)
Joe Ferguson on September 18, 1977 (all own)
Randall Cunningham on November 30, 1986 (all own)
Tony Romo on September 26, 2011 (all own)
Patrick Peterson on September 30, 2012 (3 own, 1 opponent's)
Matthew Stafford on 2013 (all own)

Opponent fumbles recovered 
 Most opponents' fumbles recovered, career: 30; Jim Marshall, 1960–1979
 Most opponents' fumbles recovered, season: 9, Don Hultz, 1963
 Most opponents' fumbles recovered, game: 3, by 15 players, most recently Brian Young, November 9, 2003

Fumble return yards 
 Longest fumble return: 104; Jack Tatum, September 24, 1972; Aeneas Williams, November 5, 2000
 Fumble return yards, career: 328, DeAngelo Hall 2004–2017
 Fumble return yards, season: 157, Dwayne Rudd, 1998
 Fumble return yards, rookie season: 98, Toby Wright, 1994
 Fumble return yards, game: 104; Jack Tatum, September 24, 1972; Aeneas Williams, November 5, 2000

Fumble return touchdowns 
 Most fumble return touchdowns, career (total): 6, Jason Taylor; 1997–2011
 Most fumble return touchdowns, season (total): 2; by 41 players, most recently Bobby Wagner 2015
 Most fumble return touchdowns, game (total): 2, Jeremy Chinn, November 29, 2020; Fred "Dippy" Evans, November 28, 1948; Al Nesser, Oct 3, 1920
 Most fumble return touchdowns, career (own recovered): 2; by 9 players, most recently Kevin Curtis 2003–2010
 Most fumble return touchdowns, season (own recovered): 2; Ahmad Rashad, 1974; Del Rodgers, 1982, Kevin Curtis 2007
 Most fumble return touchdowns, career (Opponents' recovered): 6, Jason Taylor; 1997–2011
 Most fumble return touchdowns, season (Opponents' recovered): 2; by 38 Players, most recently Bobby Wagner 2015
 Most fumble return touchdowns, game (Opponents' recovered): 2, Jeremy Chinn, November 29, 2020; Fred "Dippy" Evans, November 28, 1948; Al Nesser, Oct 3, 1920

Fumbles forced 
Most fumbles forced, career: 54; Robert Mathis, 2003–2016
 Most fumbles forced, season: 10; Osi Umenyiora, 2010; Charles Tillman, 2012
Most fumbles forced, game: 4; Charles Tillman,

Tackles 

Most solo tackles, career: 2,061 Ray Lewis, 1996–2012
Most solo tackles, season: 214, Hardy Nickerson, 1993
Most solo tackles, game: 19, most recently Shaquille Leonard, 2018

Sacks 
Quarterback sack statistics have been compiled (officially) since 
 Most seasons leading league: 2;
Mark Gastineau, 1983–84
Reggie White, 1987–88
Kevin Greene, 1994, 1996
Michael Strahan, 2001, 2003
DeMarcus Ware, 2008, 2010
Jared Allen, 2007, 2011
J. J. Watt, 2012, 2015
T. J. Watt, 2020, 2021
 Most consecutive seasons leading league: 2;
Mark Gastineau, 1983–84
Reggie White, 1987–88
T. J. Watt, 2020–2021

 Most sacks, career: 200, Bruce Smith, 1985–2003
 Most sacks, season: 22.5;
Michael Strahan, 2001
T. J. Watt, 2021
 Most sacks, rookie, season: 14.5, Jevon Kearse, 1999
 Most sacks, game: 7.0, Derrick Thomas on November 11, 1990
 Most seasons, 1+ sacks: 19, Bruce Smith, 1985–2003
 Most seasons, 10+ sacks: 13, Bruce Smith, 1986–1990, 1992–1998, 2000
 Most consecutive seasons, 10+ sacks: 9, Reggie White, 1985–1993
 Most consecutive games, sack: 11, Chris Jones, 2018
 Most seasons, 20+ sacks: 2, J. J. Watt, 2012, 2014

Overtime records 
 Most overtime field goals, career: 11, Adam Vinatieri 1996–2017
 Longest overtime field goal: 59 yards, Chandler Catanzaro vs. Cleveland Browns on October 21, 2018
 Most overtime touchdowns, career: 3, LaDainian Tomlinson 2001–2011
 Most overtime rushing touchdowns, career: 3, LaDainian Tomlinson 2001–2011
 Most overtime touchdown passes, career: 4, Drew Bledsoe 1993–2006
 Longest overtime touchdown pass/reception: 99 yards, Ron Jaworski to Mike Quick, Philadelphia Eagles vs. Atlanta Falcons Nov 10, 1985
 Longest overtime rushing touchdown: 96 yards, Garrison Hearst, San Francisco 49ers vs. New York Jets Sep 6, 1998
 Longest overtime interception returned for a touchdown: 72 yards, Lorenzo Lynch, Arizona Cardinals vs. Seattle Seahawks Oct 29, 1995
 Longest overtime kickoff returned for a touchdown: 96 yards, Chad Morton, New York Jets vs. Buffalo Bills Sep 8, 2002
 Longest overtime fumble returned for a touchdown: 52 yards, Johnie Cooks, Baltimore Colts vs. New England Patriots Sep 4, 1983
 Longest overtime punt returned for a touchdown: 99 yards, Patrick Peterson, Arizona Cardinals vs. St. Louis Rams Nov 6, 2011
 Most passing yards: 219, Derek Carr, Oakland Raiders vs. Tampa Bay Buccaneers on October 30, 2016

Miscellaneous 
 Most return (of a punt, kickoff, interception, fumble, missed field goal, blocked punt/field goal) touchdowns: 20, Devin Hester 2006–2016
 Most return (of a punt, kick, interception or fumble) touchdowns, including postseason: 21, Devin Hester 2006–2016
 Longest play for a TD: 109 yards, Antonio Cromartie on November 4, 2007 (return of a missed field goal), Cordarrelle Patterson on October 27, 2013 (kickoff return), Jamal Agnew on September 26, 2021 (return of a missed field goal)
 Most blocked kicks (field goals/PATs/punts): 25, Ted Hendricks, 1969–1983
 Longest return of a missed field goal: 109 yards, Antonio Cromartie on November 4, 2007, Jamal Agnew on September 26, 2021
 Most missed field goal returns for touchdowns: 2, Al Nelson 1965–1973, Carl Taseff 1951–1962
 Longest return of a blocked field goal: 94 yards, Bobby Smith on Oct 25, 1964
 Most blocked field goal returns for touchdowns: 2, Kyle Arrington 2010–2014, Nate Clements 2008–2009, Kevin Ross 1987–1995
 Longest return of a blocked punt: 67 yards, on Frank Filchock Sep 28, 1941
 Most blocked punt returns for touchdowns: 3, Ed Reed 2002–2013, Tom Flynn 1984–1988
 Oldest player: 48, George Blanda, 1975
 Only players to throw and catch a pass for a touchdown in the same play: 3 yards, Brad Johnson on October 12th, 1997; 37 yards, Frank Ryan on October 30th, 1960; 6 yards, Marcus Mariota on January 6, 2018 (playoff game)
  Players to throw 30+ touchdowns and 30+ interceptions in the same season: Jameis Winston 2019
  Most blocked field goals, season: 10, Bob St. Clair 1956

Oldest firsts 
 Oldest player to kick first PAT: Doug Flutie, 43 years, 70 days
 Oldest player to kick first field goal: Mose Kelsch, 36 years, 253 days
 Oldest player to score first touchdown: Whitey Woodin, 36 years, 295 days
 Oldest player to record first reception: Sonny Jurgensen, 39 years, 66 days
 Oldest player to record first receiving yard: Charlie Cowan, 37 years, 143 days
 Oldest player to record first interception: Trace Armstrong, 37 years, 78 days
 Oldest player to throw first completion: Lou Groza, 42 years, 256 days
 Oldest player to throw first touchdown pass: Mike Horan, 39 years, 301 days
 Oldest player to attempt first pass: Mike Horan, 39 years, 301 days
 Oldest player to catch first touchdown reception: Jim Turner, 36 years, 202 days
 Oldest player to record first rushing touchdown: Butch Songin, 36 years, 158 days (AFL); Bobby Hebert, 36 years, 62 days (NFL)
 Oldest player to record first rushing attempt: Charles Woodson, 39 years, 78 days
 Oldest player to record first rushing yard: Jeff Gossett, 39 years, 304 days
 Oldest player to score first point: Bill Irgens, 39
 Oldest player to record first interception return for a touchdown: Albert Lewis, 38 years, 26 days
 Oldest player to record first punt return for a touchdown: Rod Smith, 33 years, 185 days
 Oldest player to record first kick off return for a touchdown: Johnny Blood, 33 Years, 282 days

Age

Oldest
 Oldest player to have a rushing touchdown: 45 years, 151 days, Tom Brady Jan. 1, 2023
 Oldest player to have multiple rushing touchdowns in a game: 42 years, 68 days, Tom Brady Oct 10, 2019
 Oldest player to return a punt for a touchdown: 35 years, 140 days, Tim Brown Dec. 9, 2001
 Oldest player to return a kickoff for a touchdown: 33 Years, 282 days, Johnny Blood, Sep 5, 1937
 Oldest player to return an interception for a touchdown: 38 years, 26 days, Albert Lewis Nov. 1, 1998
 Oldest player to return a fumble for a touchdown: 37 years, 174 days, Sam Mills Nov 24, 1996
 Oldest player to return a blocked punt for a touchdown: 35 years, 124 days, Fritz Loven Oct. 13, 1929
 Oldest player to return a blocked punt for a touchdown (since 1930): 34 years, 319 days, Dwight Stone Dec. 12, 1998
 Oldest player to return a blocked field goal for a touchdown: 33 years, 323 days, Todd Lyght Dec 29, 2002
 Oldest player to have a 150 yard receiving game: 41 years, 70 days, Jerry Rice Dec 22, 2003
 Oldest player to have a 100 yard rushing game: 36 years, 199 days, MacArthur Lane Oct 1, 1978
 Oldest player to have a touchdown reception: 42 years, 67 days, Jerry Rice Dec 19, 2004
 Oldest player to have a 20 rushing attempts in a game: 37 years, 129 days, Frank Gore Sep 20, 2020
 Oldest player to have a 30 rushing attempts in a game: 36 years, 84 days, John Riggins Oct 27, 1985
 Oldest player to have a sack: 40 years, 282 days, Clay Matthews, Jr. Dec 22, 1996
 Oldest player to have an interception: 41 years, 304 days, Darrell Green Dec 16, 2001
 Oldest player to record a safety: 37 years, 221 days, Cameron Wake Sep 8, 2019
 Oldest player to record a two-point conversion: 38 years, 167 days, Antonio Gates Dec 2, 2018
 Oldest player to throw a touchdown pass: 47 years, 88 days, George Blanda Dec 14, 1974
 Oldest player to have a 300+ yard passing game: 45 years, 151 days, Tom Brady Jan 1, 2023
 Oldest player to have a 400+ yard passing game: 45 years, 151 days, Tom Brady Jan 1, 2023
 Oldest player to have a 500+ yard passing game: 40 years, 185 days, Tom Brady, Feb 4, 2018
 Oldest player to start in a Super Bowl:  43 years 188 days, Tom Brady, Feb 7, 2021.
 Oldest player to have a perfect passer rating (158.3): 43 years, 145 days, Tom Brady, Dec 26, 2020.
 Oldest player to lead the league in passing touchdowns: 44 years, 159 days, Tom Brady, Jan 9, 2022.

Youngest
 Youngest player to score a touchdown: 20 years, 53 days, Andy Livingston Dec 13, 1964
 Youngest player to return a punt for a touchdown: 21 years, 19 days, Dexter McCluster Sep 13, 2010
 Youngest player to return a kickoff for a touchdown: 20 years, 53 days, Andy Livingston Dec 13, 1964
 Youngest player to return an interception for a touchdown: 21 years, 44 days, DeAngelo Hall Jan 2, 2005
 Youngest player to return fumble for a touchdown: 21 years, 117 days, Ahmad Carroll Nov 29, 2004
 Youngest player to return a blocked punt for a touchdown: 21 years, 63 days, Geno Hayes Oct 12, 2008
 Youngest player to return a blocked field goal for a touchdown: 22 years, 43 days, Willie Buchanon Dec 17, 1972
 Youngest player to have a 200 yard receiving game: 21 years, 87 days, Mike Evans Nov 16, 2014
 Youngest player to have a rushing touchdown: 20 years, 167 days, Juwan Thompson Oct 5, 2014
 Youngest player to have a touchdown reception: 20 years, 239 days, Arnie Herber Nov 27, 1930
 Youngest player to have a touchdown reception since 1930: 20 years, 334 days, JuJu Smith-Schuster Oct 22, 2017
 Youngest player to have a sack: 20 years, 98 days, Amobi Okoye Sep 16, 2007
 Youngest player to have an interception: 20 years, 221 days, Tremaine Edmunds Dec 9, 2018
 Youngest player to record a safety: 21 years, 23 days, Mike Charles Oct 16, 1983
 Youngest player to record a two point conversion: 21 years, 77 days, Allen Robinson Nov 9, 2014
 Youngest player to throw a touchdown pass: 20 years, 172 days, Arnie Herber Sep 21, 1930
 Youngest player to throw a touchdown pass since 1950: 21 years, 89 days, Tommy Maddox Nov 30, 1992
 Youngest player to have a 300+ yard passing game: 21 years, 103 days, Sam Darnold Sep 16, 2018
 Youngest player to have a 400+ yard passing game: 21 years, 288 days, Matthew Stafford Nov 22, 2009
 Youngest player to have a 500+ yard passing game: 23 years, 328 days, Matthew Stafford Jan 1, 2012
 Youngest player to start in a Super Bowl: 21 years, 322 days, Bryan Bulaga Feb 6, 2011

Quarterback wins 
Note: These records are not listed in NFL Record and Fact Book
 Most career wins, regular season plus post season, by a starting quarterback: 286, Tom Brady, 2001–2022.
Most career wins, regular season, by a starting quarterback: 251, Tom Brady, 2001–2022.
 Most career wins, regular season, by a starting quarterback, single team: 219, Tom Brady, New England Patriots, 2000–2019.
 Most career wins, post-season, by a starting quarterback: 35, Tom Brady, 2001–2022.
 Most consecutive wins, regular season, by a starting quarterback: 23, Peyton Manning, Indianapolis Colts, 2008–2009
 Most consecutive wins, post-season, by a starting quarterback: 10, Tom Brady, New England Patriots, 2001, 2003–2005
 Most consecutive wins, regular season and post-season, by a starting quarterback: 21, Tom Brady, New England Patriots, 2003–2004.
 Most consecutive wins in a season, regular season and post-season, by a starting quarterback: 18, Tom Brady, New England Patriots, 2007–2008.
 Most consecutive wins, regular season, to start a career for a starting quarterback: 15, Ben Roethlisberger, Pittsburgh Steelers, 2004–2005
 Most consecutive wins to start a career, post-season, by a starting quarterback: 10, Tom Brady, New England Patriots, 2001, 2003–2005
 Most consecutive home wins, regular season and post-season, by a starting quarterback: 29, Brett Favre, Green Bay Packers, 1995–1998
 Most consecutive home wins, regular season, by a starting quarterback: 31, Tom Brady, New England Patriots, 2006–2011
 Most consecutive home wins, regular season, to start a career for a quarterback: 15, Kurt Warner, St. Louis Rams, 1999–2001
 Most consecutive home wins, regular season and post-season to start a career for a quarterback: 17, Kurt Warner, St. Louis Rams, 1999–2001
 Most consecutive road wins, regular season and post-season, by a starting quarterback: 19, Joe Montana, San Francisco 49ers, 1988–1990; Kansas City Chiefs, 1993
 Most consecutive road wins, regular season, by a starting quarterback: 18, Joe Montana, San Francisco 49ers, 1988–1990, Kansas City Chiefs, 1993
 Most road wins in a season, regular season, by a starting quarterback: 8, Joe Montana, San Francisco 49ers, 1990; Kurt Warner, St. Louis Rams, 2001; Tom Brady, New England Patriots, 2007; Tony Romo, Dallas Cowboys, 2014
 Most consecutive road wins in a season, regular season and post-season, by a starting quarterback: 10, Eli Manning, New York Giants, 2007
 Most road wins in a season, regular season and post-season, by a starting quarterback: 10, Eli Manning, New York Giants, 2007
 Most road wins in a season, regular season, for a starting rookie quarterback: 6, Ben Roethlisberger, Pittsburgh Steelers, 2004; Dak Prescott, Dallas Cowboys, 2016; Mac Jones, New England Patriots, 2021
 Most home wins in a season, regular season, for a starting rookie quarterback: 8, Russell Wilson, Seattle Seahawks, 2012
 Most road wins in a season, regular season and postseason, for a starting rookie quarterback: 7, Joe Flacco, Baltimore Ravens, 2008
 Most wins in a season, regular season and post-season, by a starting quarterback: 18, Tom Brady, New England Patriots, 2007
 Most wins in a season, regular season, by a starting quarterback: 16, Tom Brady, New England Patriots, 2007
 Most wins, regular season, by a rookie starting quarterback: 13, Ben Roethlisberger, Pittsburgh Steelers, 2004; Dak Prescott, Dallas Cowboys, 2016
 Most wins in a season, regular season and post-season, by a rookie starting quarterback: 14, Ben Roethlisberger, Pittsburgh Steelers, 2004
 Most wins in a season, post-season, by a rookie starting quarterback: 2, Joe Flacco, Baltimore Ravens, 2008; Mark Sanchez, New York Jets, 2009
 Most career home wins, post-season, by a starting quarterback: 22, Tom Brady, New England Patriots/Tampa Bay Buccaneers, 2002–2021.
 Most consecutive home wins, post-season, by a starting quarterback: 9, Tom Brady, New England Patriots, 2014–2019
 Most career road wins, post-season, by a starting quarterback: 7, Joe Flacco, Baltimore Ravens, 2008–2010, 2012, 2014, Tom Brady, New England Patriots, 2001–2019, Tampa Bay Buccaneers, 2020
 Most consecutive career road wins, post-season, by a starting quarterback: 5, Eli Manning, New York Giants 2007, 2011
 Most regular season and postseason overall victories by a starting quarterback in one stadium: 134, Tom Brady, Gillette Stadium, 2002–2019.
 Most regular season and post season home overall victories with one team by a starting quarterback: 141, Tom Brady, New England Patriots, 2001–2019.
 Most regular season home wins with one team by a starting quarterback: 121, Tom Brady, New England Patriots, 2001–2018
 Most road wins by a starting quarterback: 104, Tom Brady, 2001–2020.
 Most road wins by a starting quarterback, regular season and post-season: 111, Tom Brady, 2001–2021.
 Most NFL teams defeated at least once, career: 32, Brett Favre, Peyton Manning, Drew Brees, and Tom Brady.
 Most wins against a single opponent, regular season, by a starting quarterback: 33, Tom Brady, New England Patriots, 2001–2019, Tampa Bay Buccaneers, 2021 vs. Buffalo Bills.
 Most wins against a single opponent, regular season and post-season, by a starting quarterback: 33, Tom Brady, New England Patriots, 2001–2019, Tampa Bay Buccaneers, 2021 vs. Buffalo Bills.
 Most home wins against a single opponent, regular season and post-season, by a starting quarterback: 19, Brett Favre, Green Bay Packers, 1992–2007 Minnesota Vikings, 2009–2010 vs. Detroit Lions
 Most consecutive wins against a single opponent, regular season and post-season, by a starting quarterback: 13, Steve Young, San Francisco 49ers, vs. Los Angeles/St. Louis Rams, 1987, 1991–1998; Tom Brady, New England Patriots vs. Buffalo Bills, 2003–2010
 Most consecutive wins to start a career against a single opponent, regular season and post-season, by a starting quarterback: 11, Joe Flacco, Baltimore Ravens, 2008–2013 vs. Cleveland Browns; Andrew Luck, Indianapolis Colts, vs. Tennessee Titans, 2012–2018
 Most consecutive wins against a single opponent, regular season and post season, at home, by a starting quarterback: 19, Brett Favre, Green Bay Packers/Minnesota Vikings vs. Detroit Lions, 1992–2010
 Most wins against a single opponent, regular season (and post season), on the road, by a starting quarterback: 16, Tom Brady, vs. Buffalo Bills, 2001–2019
 Most consecutive wins against a single opponent, regular season (and post season), on the road, by a starting quarterback: 11, Brett Favre, Green Bay Packers vs. Chicago Bears, 1994–Jan. 2, 2005
 Fewest wins in a regular season by a starting quarterback who won the Super Bowl: 0, Doug Williams, Washington Redskins 1987
 Oldest starting quarterback to win a playoff game: Tom Brady (Philadelphia Eagles in Wild Card Round; 44 years 166 days).

Quarterback losses 
Note: These records are not listed in NFL Record and Fact Book
 Most career losses, regular season, by a starting quarterback: 123, Vinny Testaverde, 1987–2007
 Most career home losses, regular season, by a starting quarterback: 56, Eli Manning, 2004-2019
 Most career home losses, regular season and post-season, by a starting quarterback: 58, Eli Manning, 2004-2019
 Most career road losses, regular season, by a starting quarterback: 76, Brett Favre, 1992-2010
 Most career road losses, regular season and post-season, by a starting quarterback: 83, Brett Favre, 1992-2010
 Most career losses, post-season, by a starting quarterback: 13, Tom Brady, 2000-2022; Peyton Manning, 2000–2015.
 Most career road losses, post-season, by a starting quarterback: 7, Brett Favre, 1993–2010
 Most career home losses, post-season, by a starting quarterback: 6, Peyton Manning, 2000–2015
 Most consecutive losses, post-season, by a starting quarterback: 4, Y. A. Tittle, 1957–1963; Warren Moon 1991–1994; Andy Dalton 2011–2014
 Most consecutive road losses, post-season, by a starting quarterback: 6, Dave Krieg, 1983-1994
 Most consecutive road losses by a starting quarterback: 14, Steve DeBerg, 1978–1979
 Most consecutive home losses by a starting quarterback: 10, Archie Manning, 1979–1980; Chris Weinke, 2001–2002, 2006
 Most road losses in a season, by a rookie starting quarterback: 8, Peyton Manning, Indianapolis Colts 1998; Derek Carr, Oakland Raiders, 2014
 Most losses in a season, by a starting quarterback: 15, Archie Manning, New Orleans Saints, 1980; Jeff George, Indianapolis Colts, 1991; DeShone Kizer, Cleveland Browns, 2017
 Most consecutive losses, by a rookie starting quarterback: 15, DeShone Kizer, Cleveland Browns, 2017
 Most losses in a season, by a rookie starting quarterback: 15, DeShone Kizer, Cleveland Browns, 2017
 Most consecutive losses in a season, by a starting quarterback: 15, DeShone Kizer, Cleveland Browns, 2017
 Most consecutive losses to start a season, by a starting quarterback: 15, DeShone Kizer, Cleveland Browns, 2017
 Most consecutive losses by a starting quarterback: 21, Dan Pastorini, Houston Oilers, 1972–1974
 Most consecutive losses by a starting quarterback, regular season, to start a career: 15, DeShone Kizer, Cleveland Browns, 2017
 Most consecutive road losses by a starting quarterback, regular season, to start a career: 13, Joey Harrington, Detroit Lions, 2002–2003; David Klingler, Cincinnati Bengals, 1992–1994
 Most losses during the regular season by a starting quarterback who won the Super Bowl: 7, Eli Manning, New York Giants, 2011

Professional football firsts

Rushing
 First 1,000 yard rushing season: Beattie Feathers, 1,004 rushing yards, Chicago Bears, 1934
 First 1,500 yard rushing season: Jim Brown, 1,527 rushing yards, Cleveland Browns, 1958
 First 2,000 yard rushing season: O. J. Simpson, 2,003 rushing yards, Buffalo Bills, 1973
 First 15 rushing touchdown season: Steve Van Buren, 15 rushing touchdowns, Philadelphia, 1945
 First 20 rushing touchdown season: John Riggins, 24 rushing touchdowns, Washington Redskins, 1983
 First 25 rushing touchdown season: Emmitt Smith, 25 rushing touchdowns, Dallas Cowboys, 1995
 First 200 rush attempt season: Tuffy Leemans, 206 rush attempts, New York Giants, 1936
 First 300 rush attempt season: Jim Brown, 305 rush attempts, Cleveland Browns, 1961
 First 400 rush attempt season: James Wilder Sr., 407 rush attempts, Tampa Bay Buccaneers, 1984
 First 200 yard rushing game: Cliff Battles, 215 rushing yards, Boston Braves vs. New York Giants; Oct 8, 1933
 First 250 yard rushing game: Spec Sanders, 250 rushing yards, New York Yankees vs. Chicago Rockets; Oct 24, 1947
 First 5 rushing touchdown game: Jimmy Conzelman, 5 rushing touchdowns, Rock Island vs. Evansville; Oct 15, 1922 
 First 6 rushing touchdown game: Ernie Nevers, 6 rushing touchdowns, Chicago Cardinals vs. Chicago Bears; Nov 28, 1929 
 First 40 rushing attempt game: Lydell Mitchell, 40 rushing attempts, Baltimore Colts vs. New York Jets; October 20, 1974

Passing
 First 1,000 yard passing season: Curly Lambeau, 1,094 passing yards, Green Bay Packers, 1924
 First 1,500 yard passing season: Cecil Isbell, 2,021 passing yards, Green Bay Packers, 1942
 First 2,000 yard passing season: Cecil Isbell, 2,021 passing yards, Green Bay Packers, 1942
 First 2,500 yard passing season: Sammy Baugh, 2,938 passing yards, Washington Redskins, 1947
 First 3,000 yard passing season: Johnny Unitas, 3,099 passing yards, Baltimore Colts, 1960
 First 3,500 yard passing season: Sonny Jurgensen, 3,723 passing yards, Washington Redskins, 1961
 First 4,000 yard passing season: Joe Namath, 4,007 passing yards, New York Jets, 1967
 First 4,500 yard passing season: Dan Fouts, 4,715 passing yards, San Diego Chargers, 1980
 First 5,000 yard passing season: Dan Marino, 5,084 passing yards, Miami Dolphins, 1984
 First 300 completion season: Fran Tarkenton, 345 completions, Minnesota Vikings, 1978
 First 350 completion season: Dan Fouts, 360 completions, San Diego Chargers, 1981
 First 400 completion season: Warren Moon, 404 completions, Houston Oilers, 1991
 First 450 completion season: Peyton Manning, 450 completions, Indianapolis Colts, 2010
 First 20 touchdown pass season: Benny Friedman, 20 touchdown passes, New York Giants, 1929 
 First 30 touchdown pass season: Johnny Unitas, 32 touchdown passes, Baltimore Colts, 1959
 First 40 touchdown pass season: Dan Marino, 48 touchdown passes, Miami Dolphins, 1984
 First 50 touchdown pass season: Tom Brady, 50 touchdown passes, New England Patriots, 2007
 First 55 touchdown pass season: Peyton Manning, 55 touchdown passes, Denver Broncos, 2013
 First 400 yard passing game: Sid Luckman, 433 passing yards, Chicago Bears vs. New York Giants; Nov 14, 1943
 First 500 yard passing game: Norm Van Brocklin, 554 passing yards, Los Angeles Rams vs. New York Yanks; Sep 28, 1951
 First 40 completion game: Richard Todd, 42 completions, New York Jets vs. San Francisco 49ers; Sep 21, 1980
 First 4 touchdown pass game: Benny Friedman
 First 5 touchdown pass game: Ray Buivid, Chicago Bears vs. Chicago Cardinals; December 5, 1937
 First 6 touchdown pass game: Sammy Baugh, Washington Redskins vs. Brooklyn Dodgers; Oct 31, 1943
 First 7 touchdown pass game: Sid Luckman, Chicago Bears vs. New York Giants; Nov 14, 1943
 First player with 100 career touchdown passes: Sammy Baugh
 First player with 200 career touchdown passes: Y. A. Tittle
 First player with 300 career touchdown passes: Fran Tarkenton
 First player with 400 career touchdown passes: Dan Marino
 First player with 500 career touchdown passes: Brett Favre
 First player with 600 career touchdown passes: Tom Brady.
 First player with 10,000 career passing yards: Sammy Baugh
 First player with 20,000 career passing yards: Sammy Baugh
 First player with 30,000 career passing yards: Johnny Unitas
 First player with 40,000 career passing yards: Johnny Unitas
 First player with 50,000 career passing yards: Dan Marino
 First player with 60,000 career passing yards: Dan Marino
 First player with 70,000 career passing yards: Brett Favre
 First player with 80,000 career passing yards: Drew Brees
 First player with 1,000 career pass completions: Bobby Layne
 First player with 2,000 career pass completions: Y. A. Tittle
 First player with 3,000 career pass completions: Fran Tarkenton
 First player with 4,000 career pass completions: Dan Marino
 First player with 5,000 career pass completions: Brett Favre
 First player with 6,000 career pass completions: Brett Favre
 First player with 7,000 career pass completions: Drew Brees
 First player with 1,000 career pass attempts: Arnie Herber
 First player with 2,000 career pass attempts: Sammy Baugh
 First player with 3,000 career pass attempts: Bobby Layne
 First player with 4,000 career pass attempts: Johnny Unitas
 First player with 5,000 career pass attempts: Johnny Unitas
 First player with 6,000 career pass attempts: Fran Tarkenton
 First player with 7,000 career pass attempts: Dan Marino
 First player with 8,000 career pass attempts: Dan Marino
 First player with 9,000 career pass attempts: Brett Favre
 First player with 10,000 career pass attempts: Brett Favre
 First player with 11,000 career pass attempts: Tom Brady
 First player with 12,000 career pass attempts: Tom Brady
 First player with 100 career passing interceptions: Sammy Baugh
 First player with 200 career passing interceptions: Sammy Baugh
 First player with 300 career passing interceptions: Brett Favre

Receiving
 First 50 reception season: Don Looney, 58 receptions, Philadelphia Eagles, 1940
 First 100 reception season: Lionel Taylor, 100 receptions, Denver Broncos (American Football League), 1961
 First 100 reception, season by an NFL Player: 106, Art Monk, 1984
 First 15 reception game: Tom Fears, 18 receptions, Los Angeles Rams vs. Green Bay Packers; Dec 3, 1950
 First 20 reception game: Terrell Owens, 20 receptions, San Francisco 49ers vs. Chicago Bears; Dec 17, 2000
 First 10 touchdown reception season: Johnny McNally, 11 touchdown receptions, Green Bay Packers, 1931 
 First 15 touchdown reception season: Don Hutson, 17 touchdown receptions, Green Bay Packers, 1942
 First 20 touchdown reception season: Jerry Rice, 22 touchdown receptions, San Francisco, 1987
 First 1,000 yard receiving season: Don Hutson, 1,211 receiving yards, Green Bay Packers, 1942
 First 1,500 yard receiving season: Charley Hennigan, 1,746 receiving yards, Houston Oilers (American Football League), 1961
 First 200 yard receiving game: Don Hutson, 209 receiving yards, Green Bay Packers; Oct 18, 1942
 First 250 yard receiving game: Jim Benton, 303 receiving yards, Cleveland Browns vs. Detroit Lions; Nov 22, 1945
 First 300 yard receiving game: Jim Benton, 303 receiving yards, Cleveland Browns vs. Detroit Lions; Nov 22, 1945
 First 5 touchdown reception game: Bob Shaw, 5 touchdown receptions, Chicago Cardinals vs. Baltimore Colts; Oct 2, 1950

Scrimmage
 First 1,000 yards from Scrimmage season: Beattie Feathers, 1,178 yards from scrimmage, Chicago Bears, 1934
 First 1,500 yards from Scrimmage season: Chet Mutryn, 1,617 yards from scrimmage, Buffalo Bills (AAFC), 1948 (not recognized as an NFL record)
 First 2,000 yards from Scrimmage season: Jim Brown, 2,131 yards from scrimmage yards, Cleveland Browns, 1963
 First 2,500 yards from Scrimmage season: Chris Johnson, 2,509 from scrimmage yards, Tennessee Titans, 2009 – only 2,500 yard season
 First 300 yards from Scrimmage game: Jim Benton, 303 yards from scrimmage (all receiving), Cleveland Browns vs. Detroit Lions; Nov 22, 1945

Combined yards
 First 1,000 combined yards season: Beattie Feathers, 1,178 combined yards, Chicago Bears, 1934
 First 1,500 combined yards season: Harry Clarke, 1,575 combined yards, Chicago Bears, 1943
 First 2,000 combined yards season: Spec Sanders, 2,202 combined yards, New York Yanks, 1960
 First 2,500 combined yards season: Lionel James, 2,535 combined yards, San Diego Chargers, 1985
 First 300 combined yards game: Jim Benton, 303 combined yards, Cleveland Browns vs. Detroit Lions; Nov 22, 1945
 First 350 combined yards game: Billy Cannon, 373 combined yards, Houston Oilers vs. New York Titans (American Football League); Dec 10, 1961
 First 400 combined yards game: Glyn Milburn, 404 combined yards, Denver Broncos vs. Seattle Seahawks; Dec 10, 1995 – only 400 combined yard game

Touchdowns
 First 15 touchdown season: Don Hutson, 17 touchdowns, Green Bay Packers, 1942
 First 20 touchdown season: Lenny Moore, 20 touchdowns, Baltimore Colts, 1964
 First 25 touchdown season: Emmitt Smith, 25 touchdowns, Dallas Cowboys, 1995
 First 30 touchdown season: LaDainian Tomlinson, 31 touchdowns, San Diego Chargers, 2006
 First 5 touchdown game: Jimmy Conzelman, 5 touchdowns, Rock Island vs. Evansville; Oct 15, 1922

Scoring
 First 100 point season: Don Hutson, 138 points, Green Bay Packers, 1942
 First 150 point season: Paul Hornung, 176 points, Green Bay Packers, 1960
 First 50 yard field goal, estimated: Paddy Driscoll, 50 to 55 yards, Chicago Cardinals vs. Milwaukee Badgers; Sep 28, 1924 (drop kick) 
 First 50 yard field goal, confirmed: Glenn Presnell, 54 yards, Detroit Lions vs. Green Bay Packers; Oct 7, 1934
 First 55 yard field goal, confirmed: Bert Rechichar, 56 yards, Baltimore Colts vs. Chicago Bears; Sep 27, 1953
 First 60 yard field goal: Tom Dempsey, 63 yards, New Orleans Saints vs. Detroit Lions; Nov 8, 1970
 First 5 field goal game: Bob Waterfield, 5 field goals, Los Angeles Rams vs Detroit Lions; Dec 9, 1951

Starts
 First quarterback with 100 consecutive starts: Ron Jaworski Nov 27, 1983
 First quarterback with 200 consecutive starts: Brett Favre Nov 29, 2004

Wins
 First NFL quarterback to defeat 32 franchises: Brett Favre vs. Green Bay Packers; Oct 5, 2009
 First NFL quarterback to reach 100 career wins (regular season): Johnny Unitas vs. Green Bay Packers; November 9, 1969
 First NFL quarterback to reach 150 career wins (regular season): Brett Favre vs. San Diego Chargers; September 23, 2007
 First NFL quarterback to reach 200 career wins (regular season): Tom Brady vs. Kansas City Chiefs; October 14, 2018
 First NFL quarterback to reach 200 career wins (regular season and postseason combined): Peyton Manning vs. Carolina Panthers; February 7, 2016
 First NFL quarterback to reach 250 career wins (regular season and postseason combined): Tom Brady vs. Carolina Panthers; September 20, 2020
 First NFL quarterback to reach 250 career wins (regular season): Tom Brady vs. Arizona Cardinals; December 25, 2022

Longest play
 Longest non-scoring play: 104 yards, Percy Harvin, Minnesota Vikings vs. Atlanta Falcons; Nov 27, 2011 and Ameer Abdullah, Detroit Lions vs. Green Bay Packers; Nov 15, 2015
 Longest run by a quarterback: 93 yards, Terrelle Pryor, Oakland Raiders vs. Pittsburgh Steelers; October 27, 2013
 Longest field goal return: 109 yards, Antonio Cromartie, San Diego Chargers vs. Minnesota Vikings; November 4, 2007 and Jamal Agnew, Jacksonville Jaguars vs. Arizona Cardinals; September 26, 2021
 Longest run from scrimmage: 99 yards, Tony Dorsett, Dallas Cowboys vs. Minnesota Vikings; January 3, 1983 and Derrick Henry, Tennessee Titans vs. Jacksonville Jaguars; December 6, 2018
 Longest pass: 99 yards, by 13 players, most recently Eli Manning, New York Giants vs. New York Jets; December 24, 2011 (Victor Cruz) 
 Longest kickoff return: 109 yards, Cordarrelle Patterson, Minnesota Vikings vs. Green Bay Packers; October 27, 2013

See also
List of National Football League records (team)
List of Super Bowl records
List of gridiron football quarterbacks passing statistics

References

External links 
NFL.com – NFL History – Record and Factbook

National Football League records and achievements
National Football League lists